= List of settlements on the Lake Ohrid shoreline =

This is a list of settlements located on the coastline of Lake Ohrid which is located between the countries of North Macedonia and Albania. Settlements are automatically listed from east of the River Drin outflow from the Lake, clockwise. The table can be reorganised based on country, municipality name, population, and the language(s) spoken in the settlement. Major settlements (population of 1000 or greater) are highlighted in bold.

| Settlement name | Country | Other names | Municipality | Population | Date, Source | Language(s) |
|---|---|---|---|---|---|---|
| **Struga** | North Macedonia | Струга, Strugë | Struga Municipality | **16,559** | 2002 census | Macedonian, Albanian |
| **Misleševo** | North Macedonia | Мислешево, Mislleshova | Struga Municipality | **3,507** | 2002 census | Macedonian, Albanian |
| Orovnik | North Macedonia | Оровник | Debarca Municipality | 440 | 2002 census | Macedonian |
| Podmolje | North Macedonia | Подмоље | Ohrid Municipality | 720 | 2002 census | Macedonian |
| **Ohrid** | North Macedonia | Охрид | Ohrid Municipality | **42,033** | 2002 census | Macedonian |
| Šipokno | North Macedonia | Шипокно | Ohrid Municipality | 5 | 2002 census | Macedonian |
| Dolno Konjsko | North Macedonia | Долно Коњско | Ohrid Municipality | 551 | 2002 census | Macedonian |
| Lagadin | North Macedonia | Лагадин | Ohrid Municipality | 20 | 2002 census | Macedonian |
| Elšani | North Macedonia | Elshani, Елшани | Ohrid Municipality | 590 | 2002 census | Macedonian |
| **Peštani** | North Macedonia | Пештани, Peščani, Пешчани | Ohrid Municipality | **1,326** | 2002 census | Macedonian |
| Trpejca | North Macedonia | Трпејца | Ohrid Municipality | 303 | 2002 census | Macedonian |
| Ljubaništa | North Macedonia | Љубаништа | Ohrid Municipality | 171 | 2002 census | Macedonian |
| Tushemisht | Albania | Тушемишта | Pogradec Municipality | | | Albanian |
| Drilon | Albania | | Pogradec Municipality | | | Albanian |
| Gurras | Albania | Загоричани | Pogradec Municipality | | | Albanian |
| **Buçimas** | Albania | Starovë, Starova, Старово | Pogradec Municipality | **15,687** | 2011 census | Albanian |
| **Pogradec** | Albania | Поградец, Подградец | Pogradec Municipality | **20,848** | 2011 census | Albanian |
| Memëlisht | Albania | Memalisht, Мамулишта | Pogradec Municipality | | | Albanian |
| **Udënisht** | Albania | Udanisht, Hudënisht, Одуништа | Pogradec Municipality | **5,990** | 2011 census | Albanian |
| Piskupat | Albania | Пискупат | Pogradec Municipality | | | Albanian |
| Buqezë | Albania | Бучица | Pogradec Municipality | | | Albanian |
| Lin | Albania | Лин | Pogradec Municipality | | | Albanian, Macedonian |
| Radožda | North Macedonia | Радожда | Struga Municipality | 808 | 2002 census | Macedonian |
| **Kališta** | North Macedonia | Kalishta, Калишта | Struga Municipality | **1,178** | 2002 census | Albanian, Macedonian |
