= Sviništa =

- Свиништа
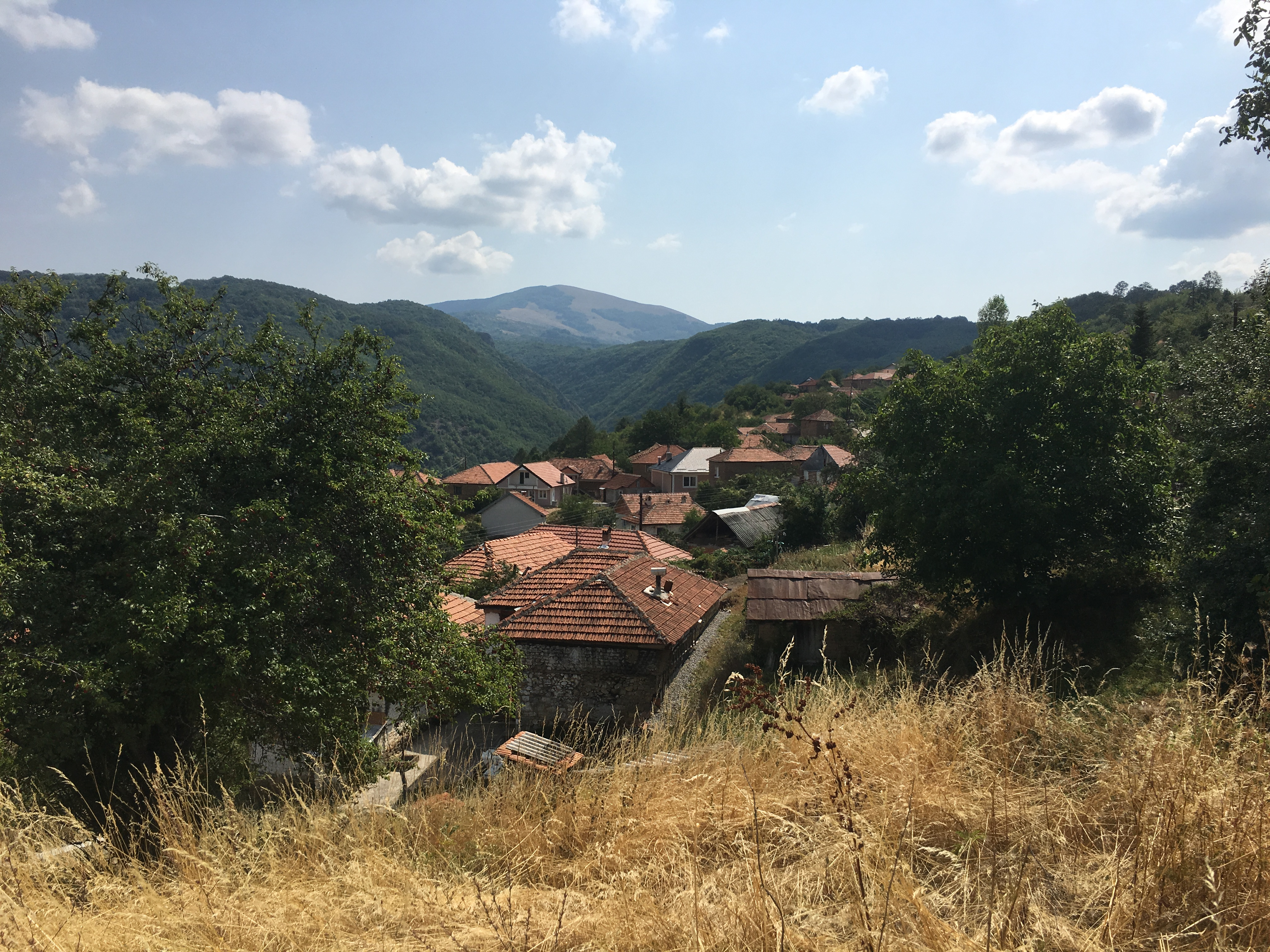
- View of the village

- Location within North Macedonia
- Coordinates: 41°12′11″N 20°56′34″E
- Country: North Macedonia
- Region: Southwestern
- Municipality: Ohrid

Population (2002)
  - Total: 64
- Climate: BSh

Sviništa (Macedonian: Свиништа) is a village in the municipality of Ohrid, North Macedonia. It used to be part of the former municipality of Kosel.

== Demographics ==
According to the national census of 2002, the village had a total of 64 inhabitants. Ethnic groups in the municipality include:

- Macedonians : 64
