= Livoišta =

Livoišta Ливоишта
- Village
- Location within North Macedonia
- Coordinates: 41.201112°N 20.814581°E
- Country: North Macedonia
- Region: Southwestern
- Municipality: Ohrid

Population (2002)
  - Total: 178
- Time zone: UTC+1 (CET)
  - Summer (DST): UTC+2 (CEST)
- Website: .

Livoišta (Macedonian: Ливоишта) is a village in the municipality of Ohrid, North Macedonia. It used to be part of the former municipality of Kosel.

== Demographics ==
According to the 2002 census, the village had a total of 178 inhabitants. Ethnic groups in the village include:

- Macedonians 178
