= Zavoj =

Zavoj Завој
- Village
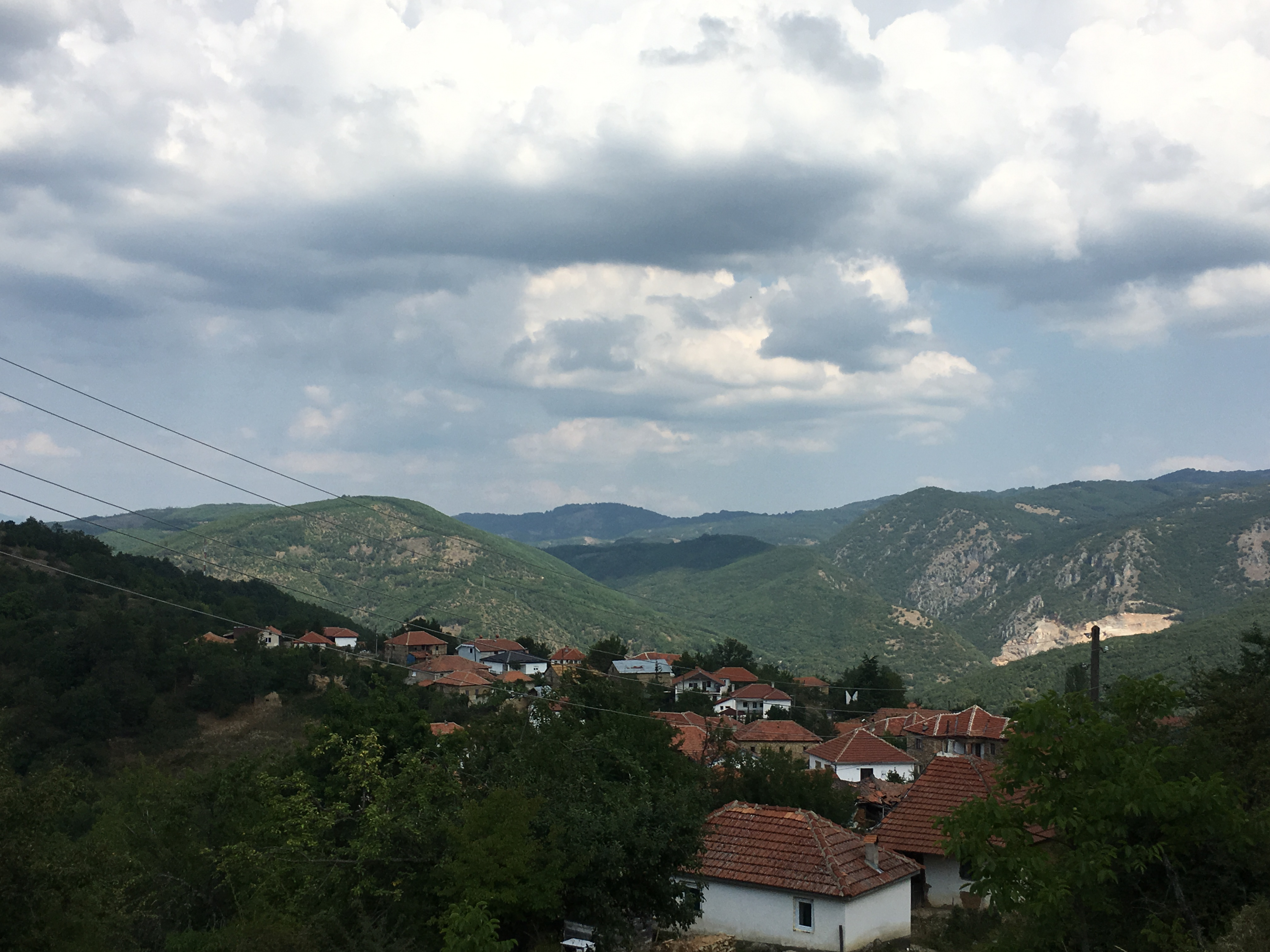
- View of the village

- Location within North Macedonia
- Country: North Macedonia
- Region: Southwestern
- Municipality: Ohrid

Population (2002)
  - Total: 12
- Time zone: UTC+1 (CET)
  - Summer (DST): UTC+2 (CEST)
- Website: .

Zavoj (Macedonian: Завој) is a village in the municipality of Ohrid, North Macedonia. It used to be part of the former municipality of Kosel.

A small village, there are no shops or schools in Zavoj. There are about a hundred houses and it houses a church of Sv. Bogorodica (The Holy Mother of God) where thousands gather to the village to celebrate the Holy Day on 28 August every year.

== Demographics ==
In the Ethnography of the Provinces of Adrianople, Monastir and Thessaloniki, published in Constantinople in 1878, Zavoj is listed as a village with 60 households and 170 Macedonian inhabitants.

According to the 2002 census, the village had a total of 12 inhabitants. Ethnic groups in the village include:

- Macedonians 12

== Tribes in Zavoj ==
Founders: Cvetanovci (9 houses), Krstanovci (8 houses) and Tasevci (6 houses), all three tribes come from Old Zavoj
