= Rača =

Rača may refer to:

== Bosnia and Herzegovina ==
- Rača, Vlasenica, a village near Vlasenica

== Croatia ==
- Nova Rača, a village and municipality near Bjelovar

== North Macedonia ==
- Rača, Ohrid

== Serbia ==
- Rača, Serbia, a town and municipality in Šumadija District
- Rača (Bajina Bašta), a village in Zlatibor District
- Rača (Kuršumlija), a village in Toplica District
- Rača (Priboj), a village in Zlatibor District
- Rača monastery, near Bajina Bašta
- Sremska Rača, in Sremska Mitrovica
  - Rača Bridge, on the border with Bosnia and Herzegovina
- Rača (Velika Morava), a river in Serbia

== Slovakia ==
- Rača, Bratislava
  - FK Rača, a football club

== Slovenia ==
- Rača, Domžale
- Rača (Kamnik Bistrica), a river in Slovenia

== See also ==
- Raca (disambiguation)
