= Elšani =

Village in the municipality of Ohrid, North Macedonia

Elšani Елшани
- Village
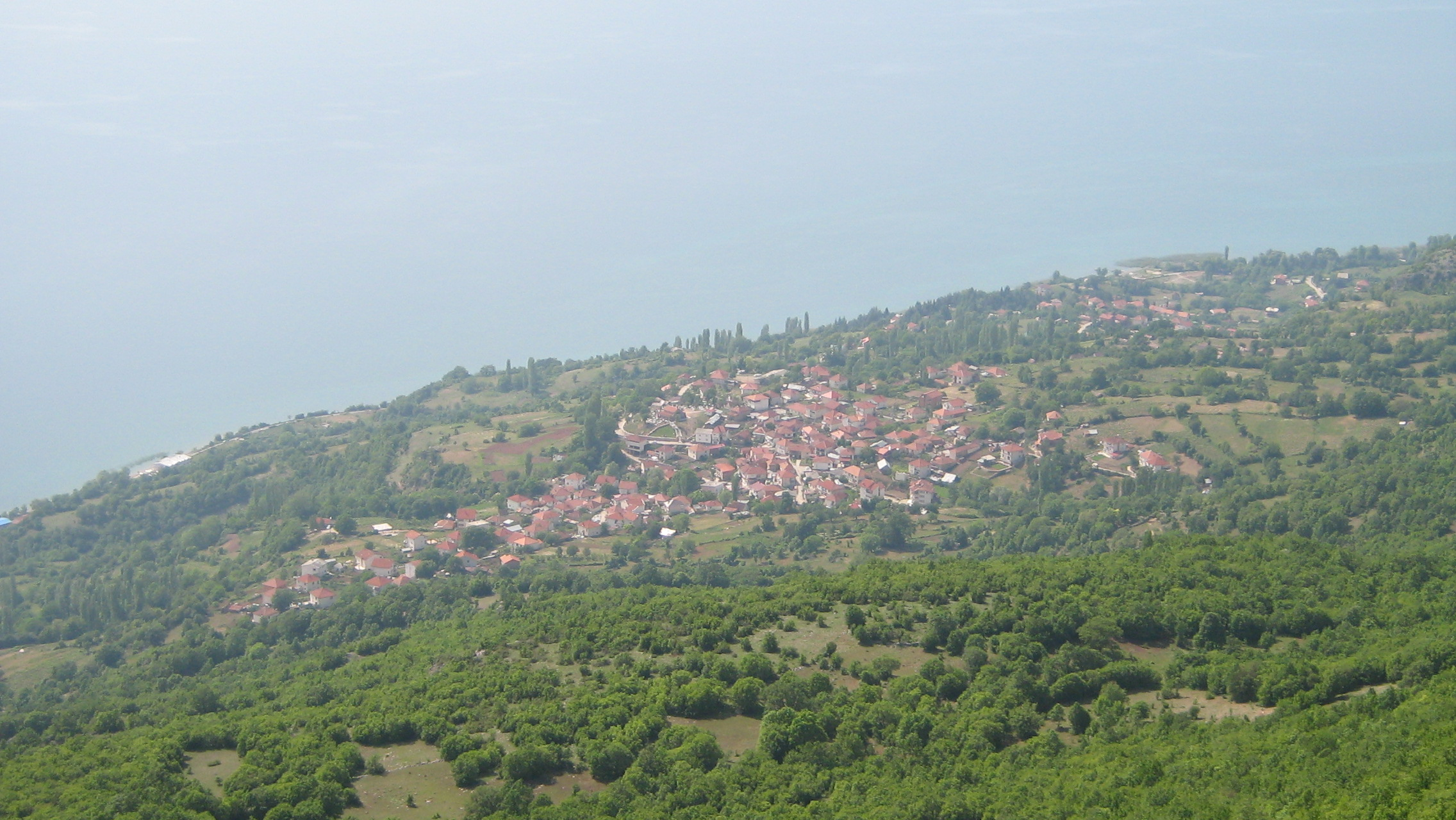
- Elšani

- Location within North Macedonia
- Coordinates: 41.026768°N 20.815366°E
- Country: North Macedonia
- Region: Southwestern
- Municipality: Ohrid
- Elevation: 850 m (2,790 ft)

Population (2021)
  - Total: 620
- Time zone: UTC+1 (CET)
  - Summer (DST): UTC+2 (CEST)
- Website: .

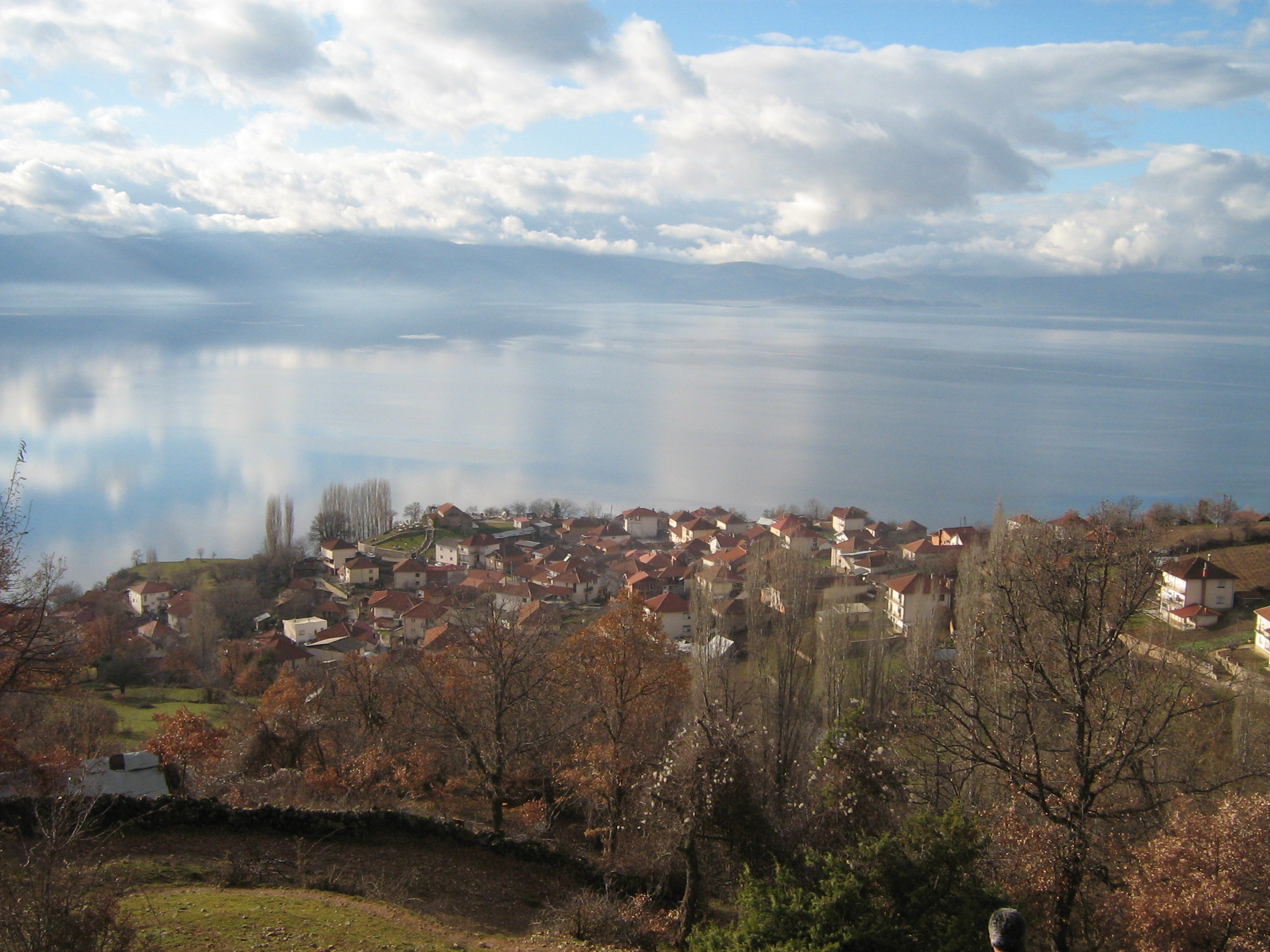
Elšani and Lake Ohrid

Elšani (Macedonian: Елшани) is a village in the municipality of Ohrid, North Macedonia. It is situated 10 kilometres (6.2 mi) south of the City of Ohrid. It is spread across the western slopes of Galičica Mountain, near Lake Ohrid. The village is located at 850 metres (2,790 ft) above sea level.

== Demographics ==
According to the statistics of Bulgarian ethnographer Vasil Kanchov from 1900, 240 inhabitants lived in Elšani, all Christian Bulgarians. Elšani has 620 inhabitants living in the village all year around, though, in the summer, there are approximately 400 additional temporary inhabitants staying in their holiday (second) homes.

As of the 2021 census, Elšani had 620 residents with the following ethnic composition:

- Macedonians 598
- Persons for whom data are taken from administrative sources 17
- Others 5

=== Ethnicity ===
All of Elšani's inhabitants are ethnic Macedonians, and Macedonian is their mother tongue.

=== Religion ===
For centuries, Orthodox Christianity has been the traditional religion in Elšani and the dating of the oldest church in the village goes back as far as 1408. The Cathedral Church is dedicated to St. Elijah (restored in 1859; painted in 1944), and there is a chapel dedicated to Saint Menas (built in 1994). The chapel of St. Petka from 1947 is shared with the neighbouring village of Peštani.

== Economy ==
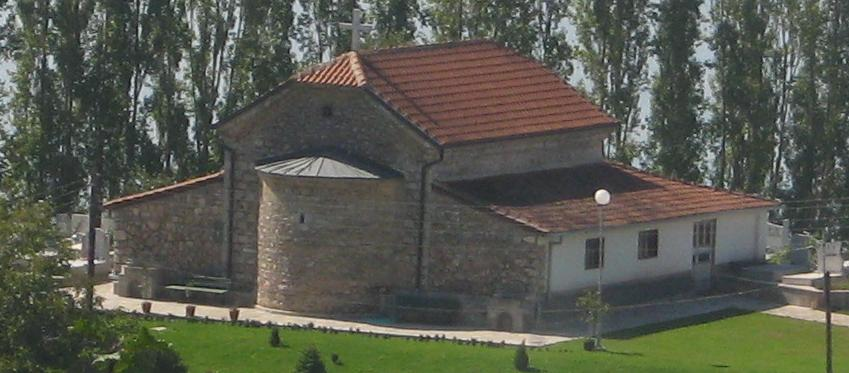
St. Elijah Church

Most of the local people work in hotels by the lakeside, or in the Ohrid factories. There are still some more traditional activities, as well: each family has its own vineyard and a garden, animals are still kept, and traditional production of wine and rakija (brandy) is still practised.

== Historical timeline of Elšani ==
- Early 13th century: first written record on Elšani under Byzantian rule
- 1395: Elšani is under Ottoman rule
- 1408: the church of St. Elijah (rebuilt)
- 19th century: Elšani has about 240 inhabitants
- 1912: end of Ottoman rule; during the First Balkan War Elšani is occupied by Serbs who impose recruitment on local men and 13 of them killed on battlefield
- 1915-1918: the time of Bulgarian military occupation during World War I
- 1918: Elšani under the rule of the new Kingdom of Serbs, Croats and Slovenes (later renamed into Kingdom of Yugoslavia)
- 1941: Italian fascist occupation
- 1943: Bulgarian occupation; many of the local men join the antifascist guerilla movement – 7 of them killed in battle
- 1944: end of the Bulgarian rule and Elšani is now in the Socialist Republic of Macedonia, which at that time is one of the six republics of the Socialist Federal Republic of Yugoslavia; the village makes the biggest progress in its centuries old history, when roads, water supply, electricity and telephony for very first time were introduced
- 1991: Elšani is now one of the prosperous villages in the independent Republic of Macedonia
