= Leskovets =

Leskovets may refer to:

- In Bulgaria (written in Cyrillic as Лесковец):
  - Leskovets, Montana Province - a village in Berkovitsa municipality, Montana Province
  - Leskovets, Pernik Province - a village in Pernik municipality, Pernik Province
  - Leskovets, Vratsa Province - a village in Oryahovo municipality, Vratsa Province
- See also:
  - Leskoec (Лескоец) in Macedonia
  - Leskovac (Лесковац) in Serbia
  - Lyaskovets (Лясковец) in Bulgaria
