= Velestovo, Ohrid =

Velestovo Велестово
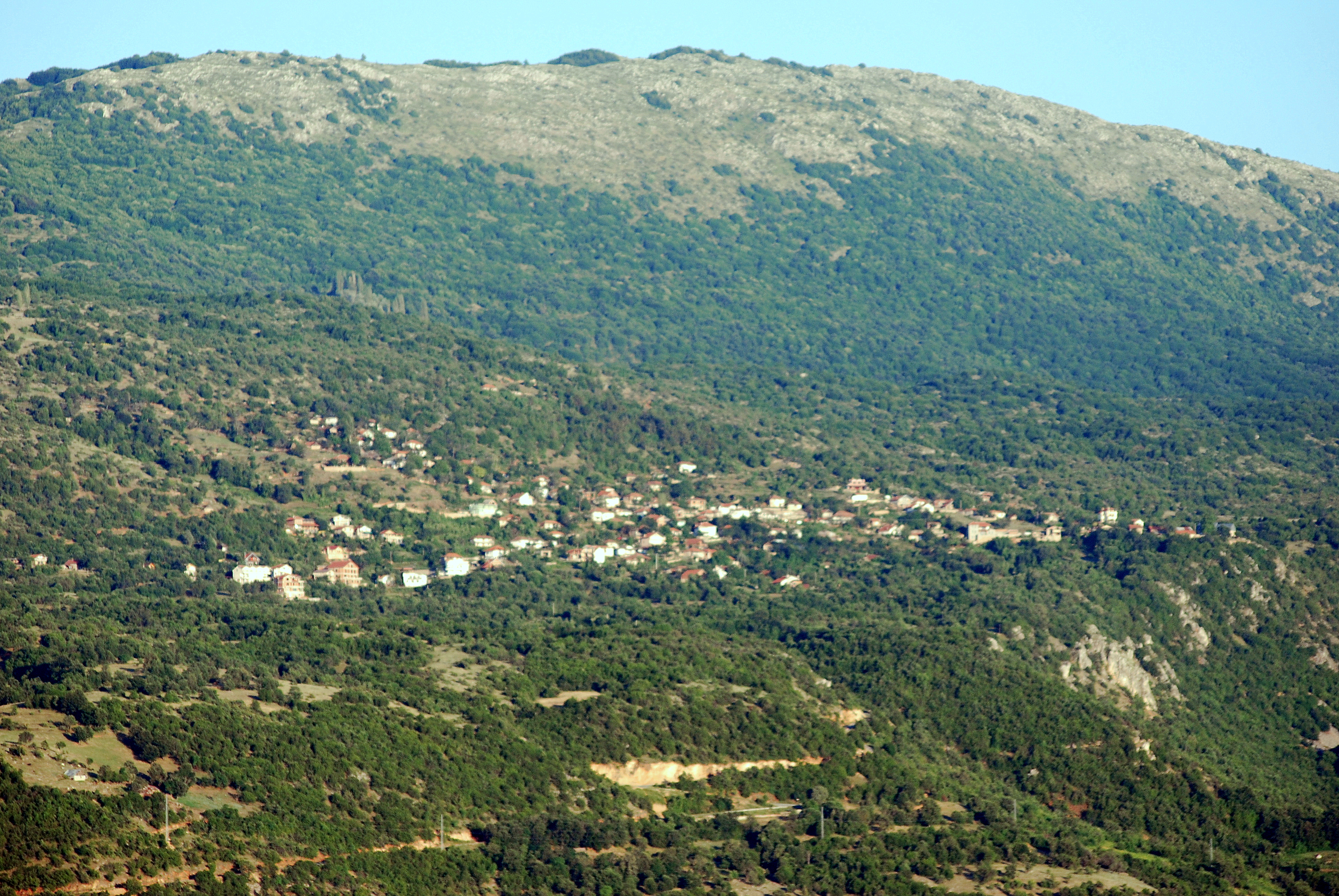
- Velestovo on Galičica Mountain

- Location within North Macedonia
- Coordinates: 41°05′00″N 20°49′40″E
- Country: North Macedonia
- Region: Southwestern
- Municipality: Ohrid

Population (2021)
  - Total: 889
- Time zone: UTC+1 (CET)

Velestovo (Macedonian: Велестово) is a village situated on the slopes of Galičica Mountain in Ohrid Municipality, North Macedonia. It is located roughly 4 kilometres from the town of Ohrid.

== Demographics ==
According to the statistics of the Bulgarian ethnographer Vasil Kanchov from 1900, 560 inhabitants lived in Velestovo, all Bulgarian Christians.

As of the 2021 census, Velestovo had 889 residents with the following ethnic composition:

- Macedonians 855
- Persons for whom data are taken from administrative sources 29
- Others 5

According to the 2002 census, the village had a total of 53 inhabitants. Ethnic groups in the village include:

- Macedonians 53

== Churches ==
- Dormition of the Theotokos Church - from the 15th century
- Holy Trinity Church - the main church of Velestovo Monastery

== Events ==
- Poetry night at Velestovo (Поетска ноќ во Велестово) - Traditional poetry festival since 1989
- Ǵomlezijada - food festival of traditional Ohrid's food Ǵomleze
- Fine Arts Colony
