= Magaro =

Magaro may refer to:

- Magaro, a peak of Galičica mountain
- John Magaro (born 1983), American actor
