= Skrebatno, North Macedonia =

Skrebatno
- Скребатно
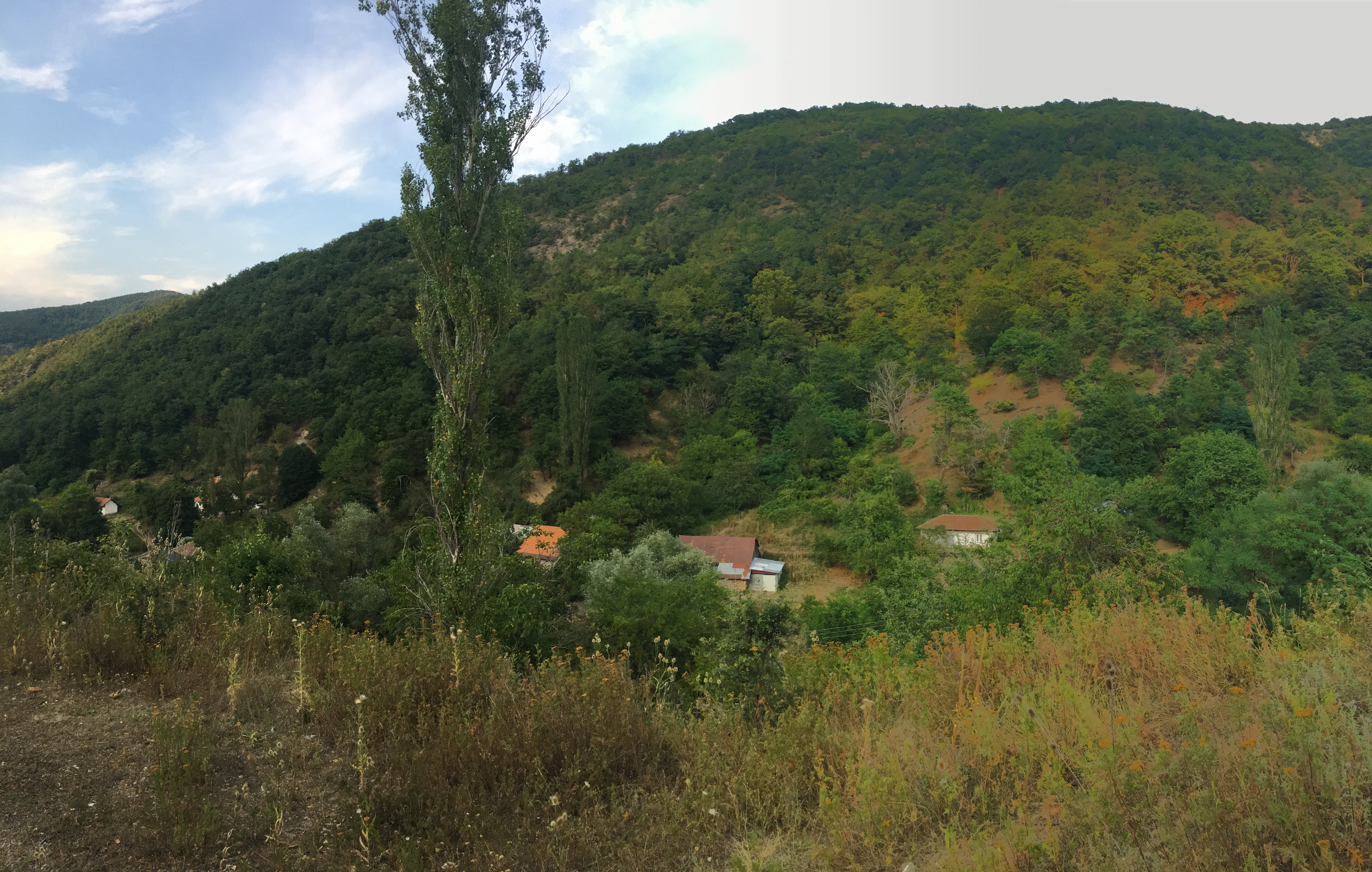
- Panoramic view of the village

- Location within North Macedonia
- Coordinates: 41°9′10″N 20°53′29″E
- Country: North Macedonia
- Region: Southwestern
- Municipality: Ohrid

Population (2002)
  - Total: 6
- Climate: BSh

Skrebatno (Macedonian: Скребатно) is a village in the municipality of Ohrid, North Macedonia. It used to be part of the former municipality of Kosel.

== Demographics ==
According to the national census of 2002, the village had a total of 6 inhabitants. Ethnic groups in the municipality include:

- Macedonians : 6
