= Plakje =

Plakje Плаќе
- Village
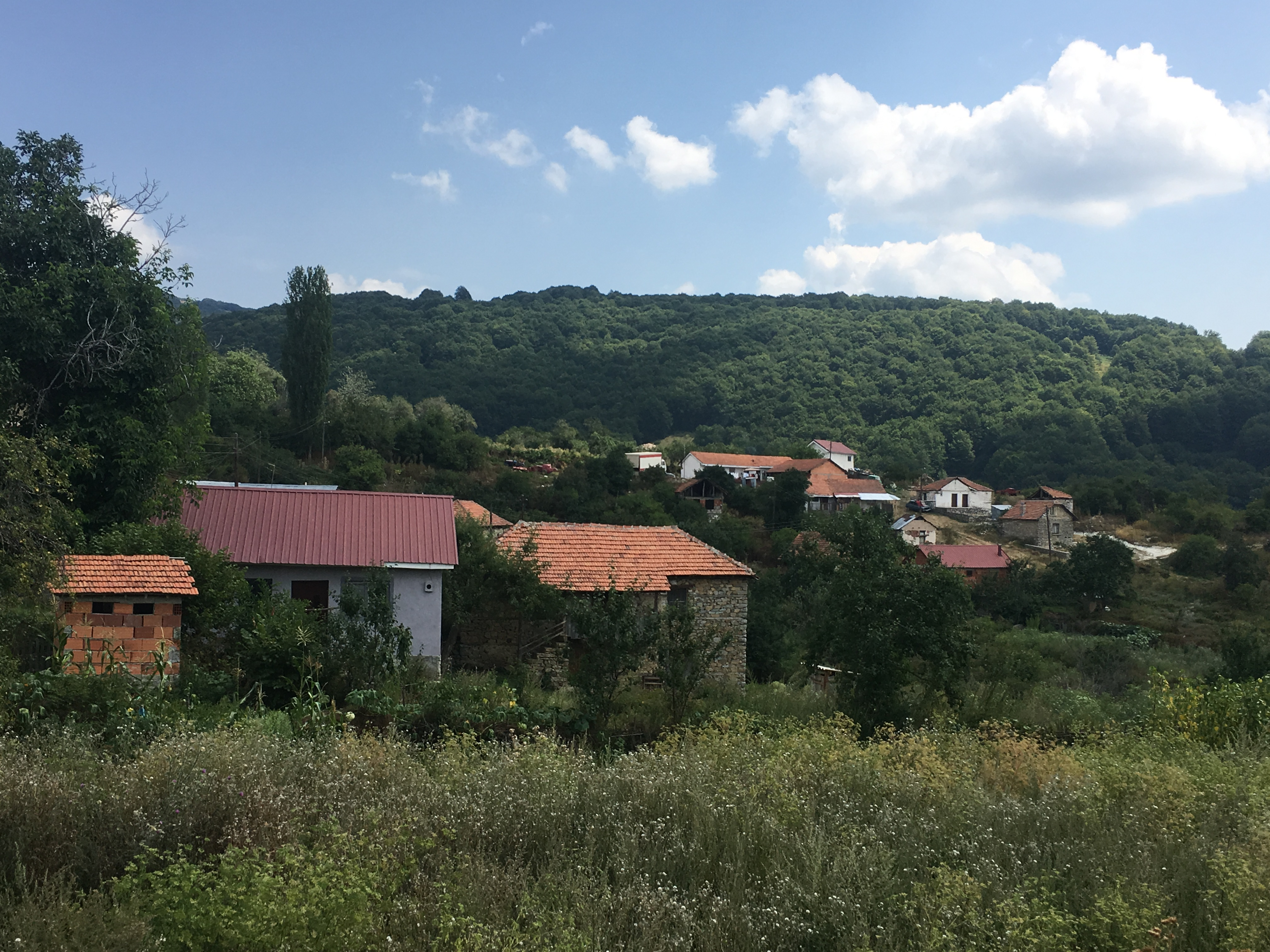
- View of the village

- Location within North Macedonia
- Country: North Macedonia
- Region: Southwestern
- Municipality: Ohrid
- Elevation: 1,371 m (4,498 ft)

Population (2002)
  - Total: 4
- Time zone: UTC+1 (CET)
- Postal code: 6306

Plakje (Macedonian: Плаќе) is a small village in the municipality of Ohrid, North Macedonia. It used to be part of the former municipality of Kosel.

== Demographics ==
According to the statistics of Bulgarian ethnographer Vasil Kanchov from 1900 the settlement is recorded as Plake with its 160 inhabitants, all Bulgarian Exarchists.

According to the 2002 census, the village had a total of 4 inhabitants. Ethnic groups in the village include:

- Macedonians 4
