= Pasko Kuzman =

Macedonian archaeologist (born 1947)

- Паско Кузман
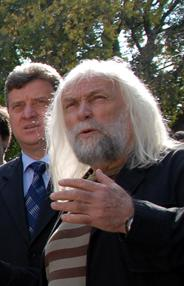
- Pasko Kuzman with Macedonian president Gjorge Ivanov

Director of Cultural Heritage Protection Office
- In office 2006–2013
- President: Gjorge Ivanov
- Prime Minister: Nikola Gruevski

Personal details
- Born: October 15, 1947 (age 78) Vapila, Socialist Republic of Macedonia
- Citizenship: Macedonian
- Profession: Archaeologist
- Website: www.paskokuzman.com

Pasko Kuzman (Macedonian: Паско Кузман; born 1947) is a Macedonian archaeologist who was the director of the Cultural Heritage Protection Office.

== Work ==
Pasko Kuzman was born in the village of Vapila in the Ohrid region, SR Macedonia, SFR Yugoslavia (now North Macedonia), on October 15, 1947. He graduated in archaeology in Belgrade. As an archaeologist specialising in prehistoric archaeology and protohistoric archaeology, he started working at the Institute for the Protection of Cultural Monuments and the National Museum of Ohrid from 1979 and was also its director from 1999 to 2004. From 1980 to 1990, he was the president of the Macedonian Archaeological Scientific Society. Kuzman also authored two poetry books called Romans (Macedonian: Римјани; 1987) and Balsamara (Macedonian: Балсамара; 1990).

Kuzman had excavated various places, such as 3,000-year-old submerged sites of Lychnidos, and some remains in the area of the Samuil's Fortress, which were built probably at the time of Philip II. He became the director of the Cultural Heritage Protection Office in 2006. During his tenure, he was one of the main proponents of the myth of historical continuity between ancient Macedonians and modern Macedonians (antiquisation). He supported the construction of a church-museum on the site of the Skopje Fortress in 2011, which caused a dispute between Albanians and Macedonians. After Macedonian and Albanian protesters injured each other in a protest in February, a spokesperson of the Social Democratic Union of Macedonia demanded his resignation. As a solution to the dispute, he suggested the reconstruction of an Ottoman-era tower. The construction of the church-museum ceased in the same year.

In 2013 he was arrested and charged with illegally issuing digging permits, and placed under house arrest for 30 days. His term as director of the Cultural Heritage Protection Office ended in the same year. A year later he was found guilty of aiding a criminal ring in excavating and selling off valuable archaeological artefacts, and was sentenced to three years in prison. In 2018, he was charged with misuse of his position as director by the financial police on the basis that he caused harm to the budget through a deal he made with a contractor of a construction company.

== Personal life and views ==
Kuzman is married and has four daughters, as well as a grandchild.

Kuzman is a self-proclaimed time traveller. He wears three watches on his left wrist, which he said help him travel through time: one takes him back to the Bronze and Neolithic Age, one takes him to the future, and the third is the "archaeological watch," which alerts him to the presence of artefacts.

Kuzman believes that the archaeological mystery of the tomb of Alexander the Great is hidden in southeastern parts of Macedonia, and pledged in an interview in late 2012 that he will never stop searching for the tomb.
