= Ramne =

Village in the municipality of Ohrid, North Macedonia

Ramne Рамне
- Village
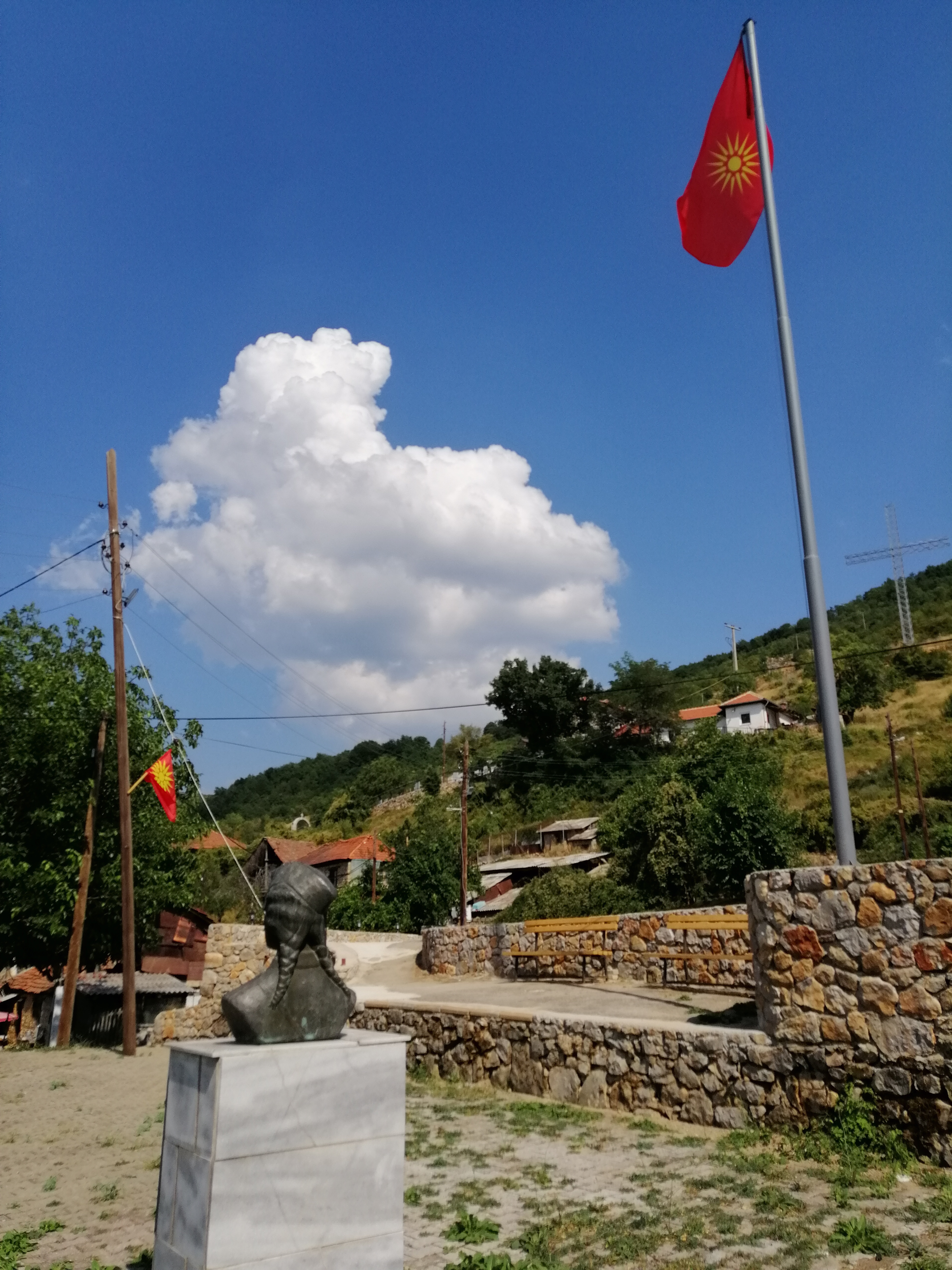

- Location within North Macedonia
- Coordinates: 41.109343°N 20.836990°E
- Country: North Macedonia
- Region: Southwestern
- Municipality: Ohrid

Population (2021)
  - Total: 617
- Time zone: UTC+1 (CET)
  - Summer (DST): UTC+2 (CEST)
- Website: .

Ramne (Macedonian: Рамне) is a village in the municipality of Ohrid, North Macedonia.

== Demographics ==
According to the statistics of the Bulgarian ethnographer Vasil Kanchov from 1900, 140 inhabitants lived in Ramne, all Bulgarian Christians.

As of the 2021 census, Ramne had 617 residents with the following ethnic composition:

- Macedonians 595
- Serbs 7
- Others 7
- Persons for whom data are taken from administrative sources 6

According to the 2002 census, the village had a total of 632 inhabitants. Ethnic groups in the village include:

- Macedonians 594
- Turks 11
- Serbs 6
- Albanians 2
- Aromanians 2
- Others 17
