= Orman, Ohrid =

Village in the municipality of Ohrid, North Macedonia

Orman Орман
- Village
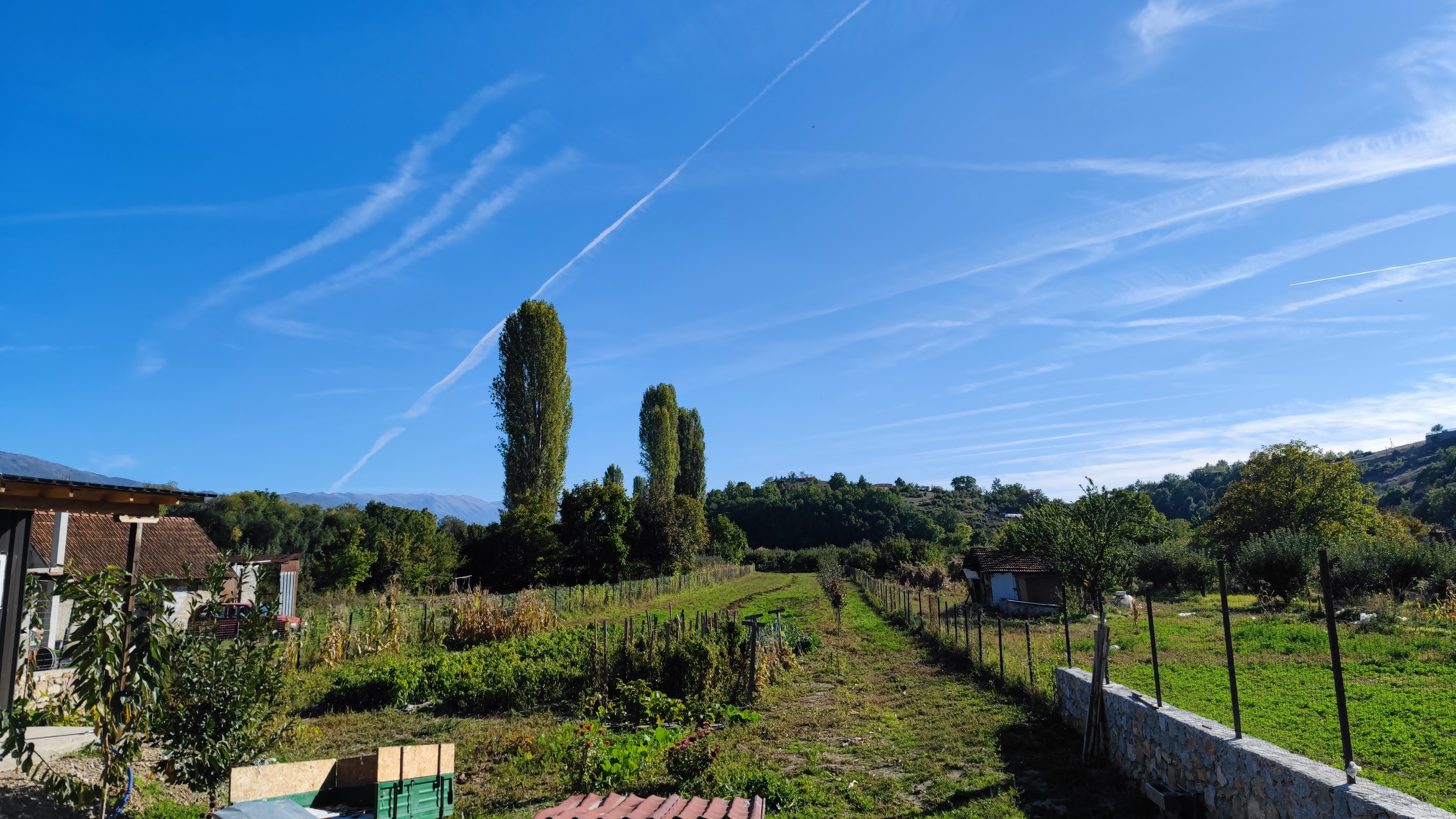

- Location within North Macedonia
- Coordinates: 41.140843°N 20.785062°E
- Country: North Macedonia
- Region: Southwestern
- Municipality: Ohrid

Population (2021)
  - Total: 119
- Time zone: UTC+1 (CET)
  - Summer (DST): UTC+2 (CEST)
- Website: .

Orman (Macedonian: Орман) is a village in the municipality of Ohrid, North Macedonia.

== Demographics ==
As of the 2021 census, Orman had 119 residents with the following ethnic composition:

- Macedonians 106
- Persons for whom data are taken from administrative sources 11
- Albanians 2

According to the 2002 census, the village had a total of 104 inhabitants. Ethnic groups in the village include:

- Macedonians 104
