= Dolno Lakočerej =

Village in the municipality of Ohrid, North Macedonia

Dolno Lakočerej Долно Лакочереј
- Village
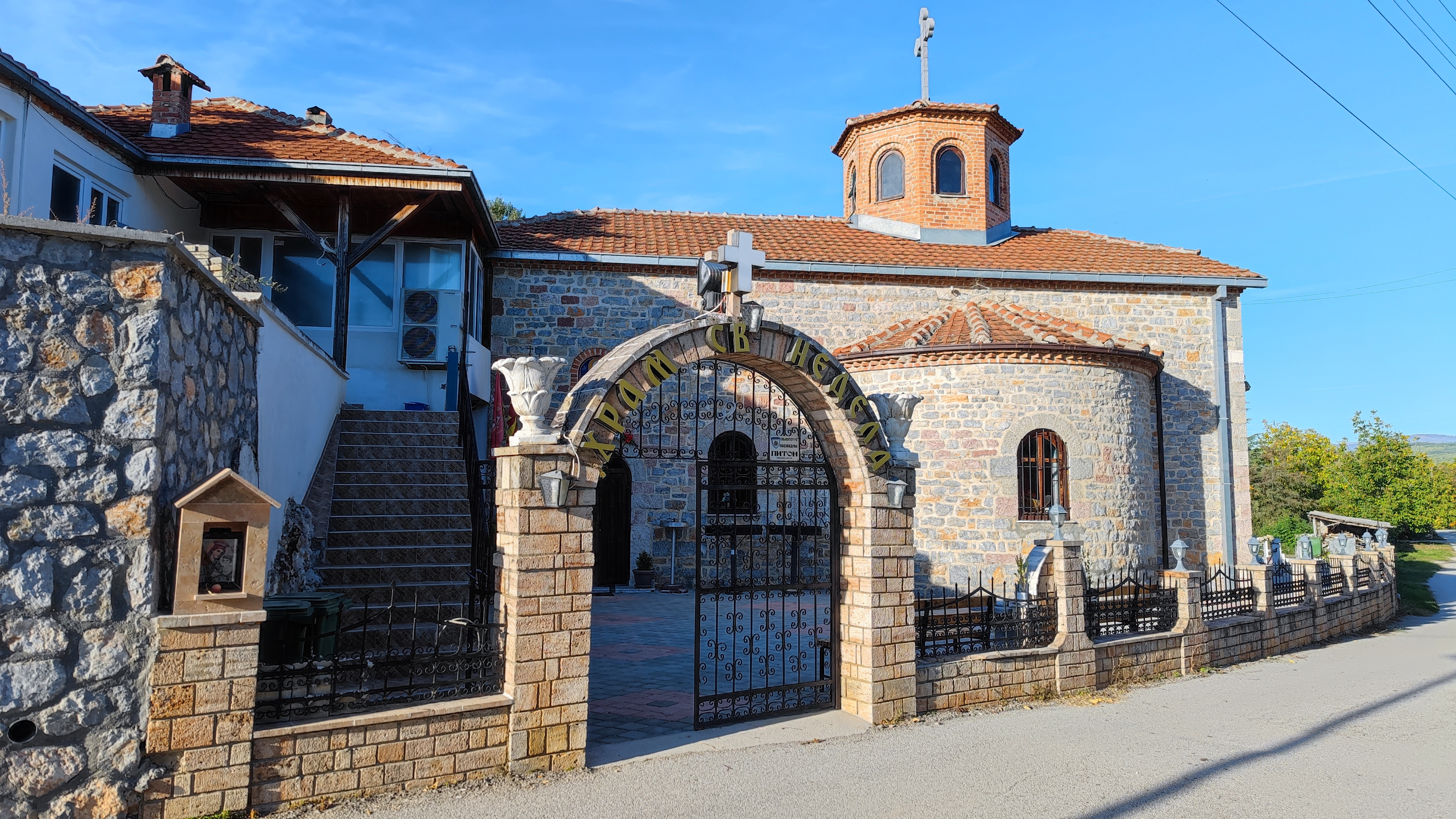
- St. Kyriaki Church

- Location within North Macedonia
- Coordinates: 41.158213°N 20.796178°E
- Country: North Macedonia
- Region: Southwestern
- Municipality: Ohrid

Population (2002)
  - Total: 728
- Time zone: UTC+1 (CET)
  - Summer (DST): UTC+2 (CEST)
- Website: .

Dolno Lakočerej (Macedonian: Долно Лакочереј) is a village in the municipality of Ohrid, North Macedonia.

== Demographics ==
According to the statistics of Bulgarian ethnographer Vasil Kanchov from 1900, 140 inhabitants lived in Dolno Lakočerej, all Christian Bulgarians.

According to the 2002 census, the village had a total of 728 inhabitants. Ethnic groups in the village include:

- Macedonians 727
- Serbs 1
