= Dolno Konjsko =

Dolno Konjsko Долно Коњско
- Village
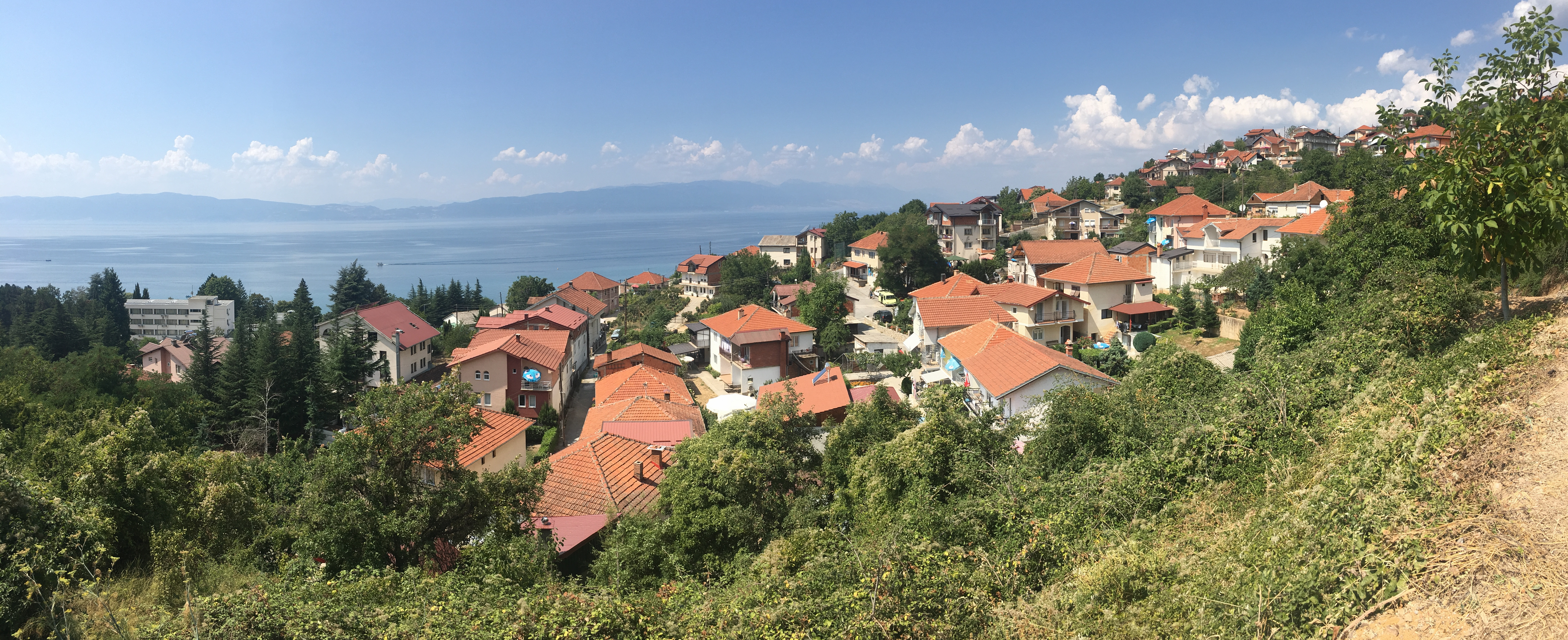
- Dolno Konjsko

- Location within North Macedonia
- Coordinates: 41.061634°N 20.802829°E
- Country: North Macedonia
- Region: Southwestern
- Municipality: Ohrid

Population (2002)
  - Total: 551
- Time zone: UTC+1 (CET)
  - Summer (DST): UTC+2 (CEST)
- Website: .

Dolno Konjsko (Macedonian: Долно Коњско) is a village in the municipality of Ohrid, North Macedonia. It is located 7 km (4.3 mi) from Ohrid and is considered a tourist location, having a lot of hotels and restaurants nearby

== Demographics ==
According to the 2002 census, the village had a total of 551 inhabitants. Ethnic groups in the village include:

- Macedonians 551
