= Sveti Stefan, Ohrid =

Village in the municipality of Ohrid, North Macedonia

Sveti Stefan Свети Стефан
- Village
- Location within North Macedonia
- Coordinates: 41.074644°N 20.803015°E
- Country: North Macedonia
- Region: Southwestern
- Municipality: Ohrid

Population (2002)
  - Total: 112
- Time zone: UTC+1 (CET)
  - Summer (DST): UTC+2 (CEST)
- Website: .

Sveti Stefan (Macedonian: Свети Стефан) is a village in the municipality of Ohrid, North Macedonia. It is a beachside town along Lake Ohrid, located south of the city of Ohrid.

== Demographics ==
According to the 2002 census, the village had a total of 112 inhabitants. Ethnic groups in the village include:

- Macedonians 111
- Others 1
