= Vapila =

Vapila Вапила
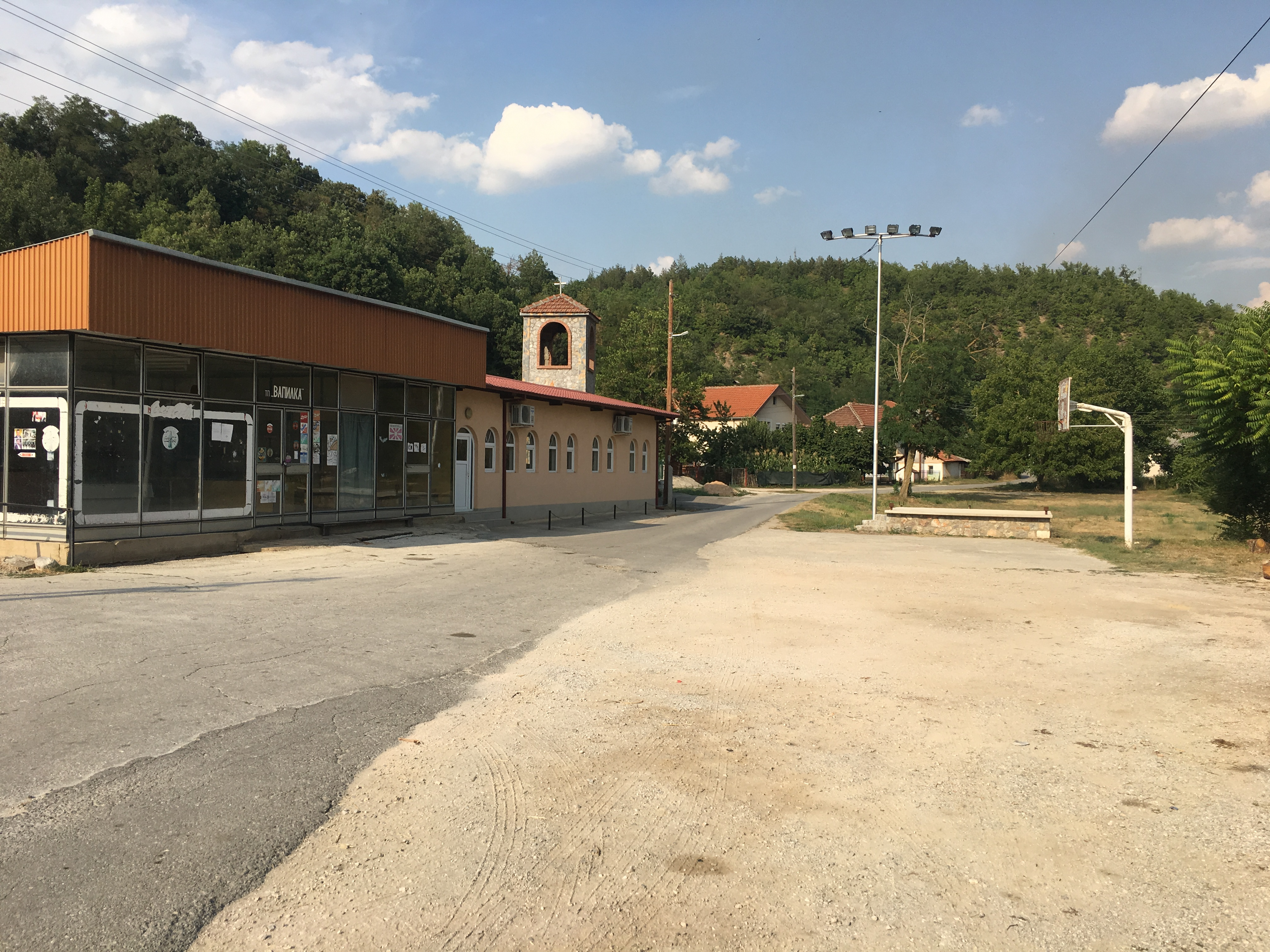
- Center of the village Vapila

- Location within North Macedonia
- Coordinates: 41°11′34″N 20°49′52″E
- Country: North Macedonia
- Region: Southwestern
- Municipality: Ohrid

Population (2002)
  - Total: 112
- Time zone: UTC+1 (CET)

Vapila (Macedonian: Вапила) is a village in the municipality of Ohrid, North Macedonia. It used to be part of the former municipality of Kosel.

== Name ==
Vapila's name derives from a typical Balkan Macedonian Ottoman dish of the area, pilev and was originally called Vapile.

== History ==
The village was initially settled by three Macedonian Christian family's around 1830, one of which was the Sandakovci or Shandakovtsi who originated from Peskopeja.

== Demographics ==
According to the 2002 census, the village had a total of 112 inhabitants. Ethnic groups in the village include:

- Macedonians 112
