= Lagadin =

Village in the municipality of Ohrid, North Macedonia

Lagadin Лагадин
- Village
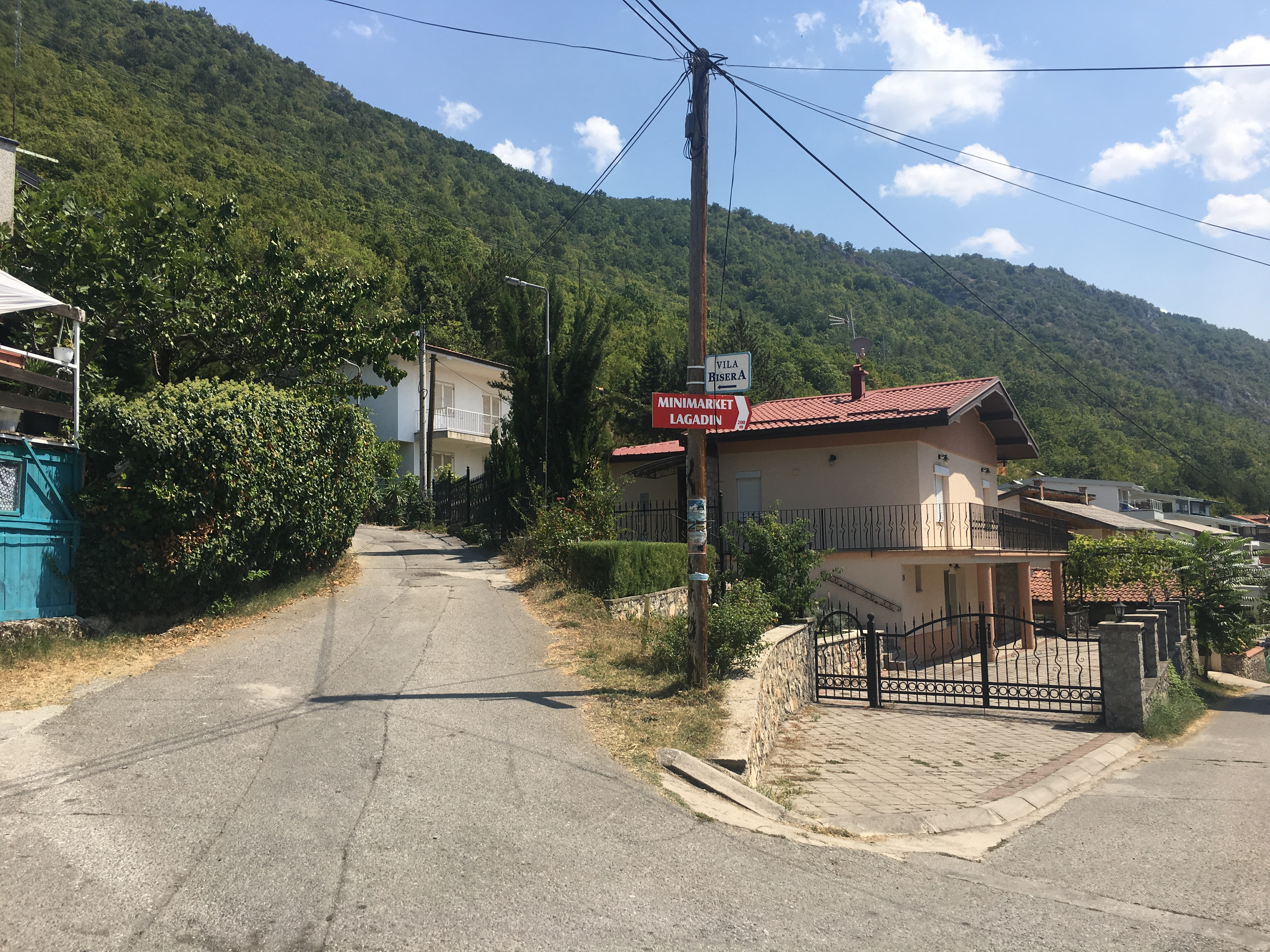
- View of Lagadin

- Location within North Macedonia
- Country: North Macedonia
- Region: Southwestern
- Municipality: Ohrid

Population (2021)
  - Total: 81
- Time zone: UTC+1 (CET)
  - Summer (DST): UTC+2 (CEST)
- Website: .

Lagadin (Macedonian: Лагадин) is a small tourist village in the municipality of Ohrid, North Macedonia, located 9 kilometres south of the city of Ohrid. It is a popular beachside destination along Lake Ohrid and lies at the foot of Galičica National Park.

== Demographics ==
As of the 2021 census, Lagadin had 81 residents with the following ethnic composition:

- Macedonians 79
- Persons for whom data are taken from administrative sources 1
- Others 1

According to the 2002 census, the village had a total of 20 inhabitants. Ethnic groups in the village include:

- Macedonians 18
- Serbs 1
- Others 1
