= Raca =

Raca or RACA may refer to:

== People ==
- Darko Raca (born 1977), Bosnian-Herzegovinian footballer
- Dragan Raca (born 1961), Cypriot–Serbian basketball player and coach
- Saša Raca, (born 1975), Bosnian Serb footballer

== Other uses ==
- Royal Academy of Culinary Arts, college in Jordan
- Royal Automobile Club of Australia, Australian organisation
- Raca, a Biblical term of Aramaic origin used in Matthew 5:22

== See also ==
- Râca, Romania
- Raça, a village and suco in East Timor in Lospalos district
- Raça, a 2011 documentary film by Joel Zito Araújo
- Rača (disambiguation)
