= Rača, Ohrid =

Village in the municipality of Ohrid, North Macedonia

Rača Рача
- Village
- Location within North Macedonia
- Coordinates: 41.091763°N 20.810519°E
- Country: North Macedonia
- Region: Southwestern
- Municipality: Ohrid

Population (2002)
  - Total: 1,043
- Time zone: UTC+1 (CET)
  - Summer (DST): UTC+2 (CEST)
- Website: .

Rača (Macedonian: Рача) is a village in the municipality of Ohrid, North Macedonia. It is located just southeast of the city of Ohrid.

== Demographics ==
According to the 2002 census, the village had a total of 1043 inhabitants. Ethnic groups in the village include:

- Macedonians 1040
- Serbs 2
- Others 1
