= Ohrid Municipality =

Municipality of North Macedonia

Coordinates: 41°08′26″N 20°48′09″E

Municipality of Ohrid Општина Охрид
- Urban municipality
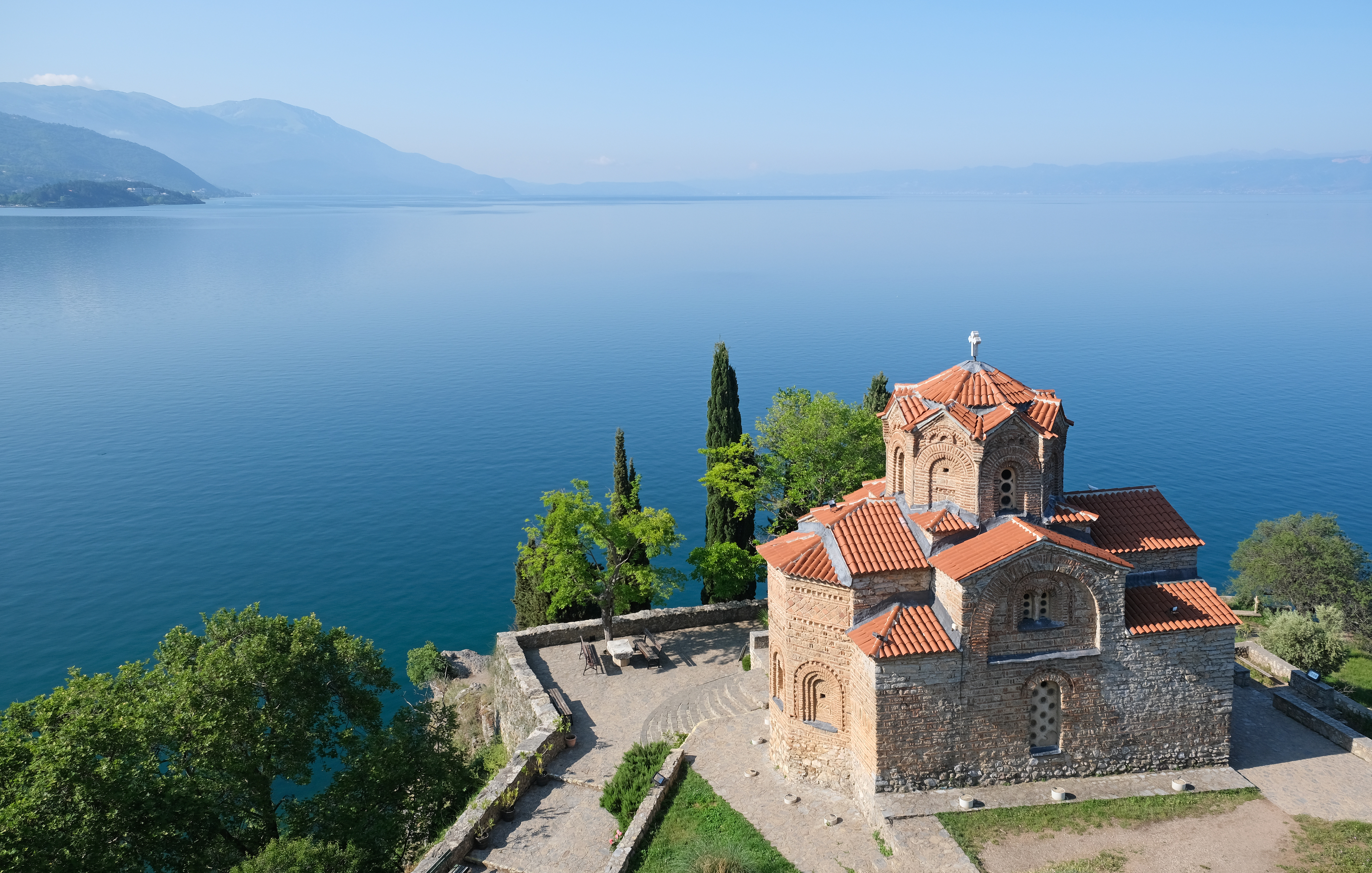
- The Church of St. John at Kaneo above the lake

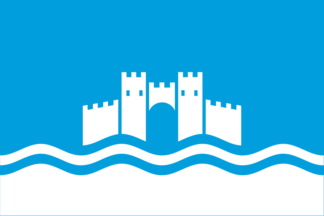
- Flag

- Country: North Macedonia
- Region: Southwestern
- Municipal seat: Ohrid

Government
  - Mayor: Kiril Pecakov (VMRO-DPMNE)

Area
  - Total: 389.93 km^{2} (150.55 sq mi)

Population
  - Total: 51,428
  - Density: 142.97/km^{2} (370.3/sq mi)
- Time zone: UTC+1 (CET)
- Postal code: 6000
- Area code: 046
- Vehicle registration: OH
- Website: http://www.Ohrid.gov.mk/

UNESCO World Heritage Site
- Official name: Natural and Cultural Heritage of the Ohrid region
- Criteria: Cultural and Natural: (i)(iii)(iv)(vii)
- Reference: 99ter
- Inscription: 1979 (3rd Session)
- Extensions: 1980, 2019
- Area: 83,350 ha (206,000 acres)

The Municipality of Ohrid (Macedonian: Општина Охрид) is a municipality in the southwestern part of North Macedonia. Ohrid is also the name of the city where the municipal seat is found. Ohrid Municipality is in the Southwestern Statistical Region.

== Geography ==
Ohrid Municipality borders

- Debarca Municipality to the west and north,
- Resen Municipality to the east, and
- Demir Hisar Municipality to the northeast.

== Demographics ==
- According to the national census of 2002, the municipality of Ohrid, before the attachment of Kosel Municipality, had 54,380 inhabitants; according to the census of 1994, it had 52,732.
- The former Kosel Municipality had a population of 1,369 in 2002 and 1,759 in 1994.

According to the 2021 North Macedonia census, the present-day combined municipality has 51,428 residents.

	2002		2021	
	Number	%	Number	%
TOTAL	55,749	100	51,428	100
Macedonians	47,344	84.92	40,488	78.73
Albanians	2,962	5.31	1,942	3.78
Turks	2,268	4.07	1,831	3.56
Vlachs	323	0.58	314	0.61
Serbs	366	0.66	281	0.55
Roma	69	0.12	232	0.45
Bosniaks	29	0.05	23	0.04
Other / Undeclared / Unknown	2,388	4.29	2,028	3.94
Persons for whom data are taken from administrative sources			4,289	8.34

== Inhabited places ==
The municipality has 29 inhabited places, one town and 28 villages.

Inhabited places in Ohrid Municipality
Village(s): Šipokno | Dolno Lakočerej | Gorno Lakočerej | Elšani | Elešec | Konjsko | Lagadin | Leskoec | Orman | Peštani | Ljubaništa | Rača | Ramne | Sveti Stefan | Trpejca | Velestovo | Velgošti | Kosel | Kuratica | Livoišta | Openica | Plakje | Rasino | Rečica | Sirula | Skrebatno | Sviništa | Vapila | Zavoj	Town(s): Ohrid

== Coat of arms ==
The coat of arms of Ohrid (Macedonian: Грб на Охрид) is the coat of arms of the Ohrid Municipality, it depicts Lake Ohrid, Tsar Samuel's Fortress, and a sailboat, the sailboat symbolizing tourism. The coat of arms is designed using the Macedonian territorial heraldic system featuring a mural crown of its status and a wreath of Macedonian oak.

The blazon is Azure, on a mount Vert a wall gated between two towers all Argent. In base a barry wavy of the first. Other elements include the shield is crowned with a Mural crown of three towers Or, central tower gated, adorned with rubies and pearls, wreathed with two oak branches Vert fructed Or joined with ribbon Gules.
