= Leskoec =

Village in the municipality of Ohrid, North Macedonia

Leskoec Лескоец
- Village
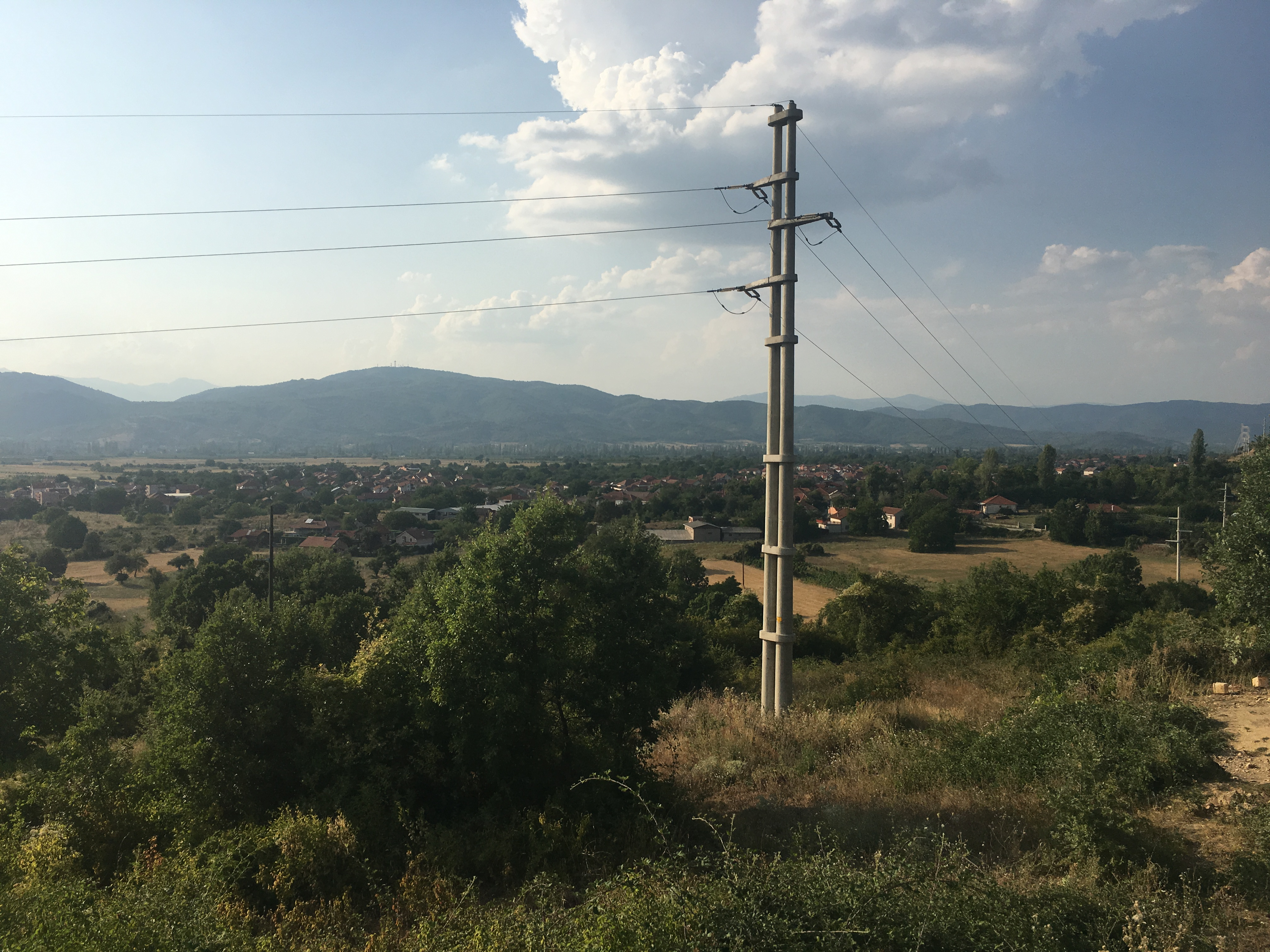
- View of the village

- Location within North Macedonia
- Country: North Macedonia
- Region: Southwestern
- Municipality: Ohrid

Population (2002)
  - Total: 2,595
- Time zone: UTC+1 (CET)
  - Summer (DST): UTC+2 (CEST)
- Website: .

Leskoec (Macedonian: Лескоец) is a village in the municipality of Ohrid, North Macedonia.

== Demographics ==
According to the 2002 census, the village had a total of 2,595 inhabitants. Ethnic groups in the village include:

- Macedonians 2,561
- Serbs 8
- Aromanians 3
- Others 23
