= Peštani =

Village in the municipality of Ohrid, North Macedonia

Peštani Пештани
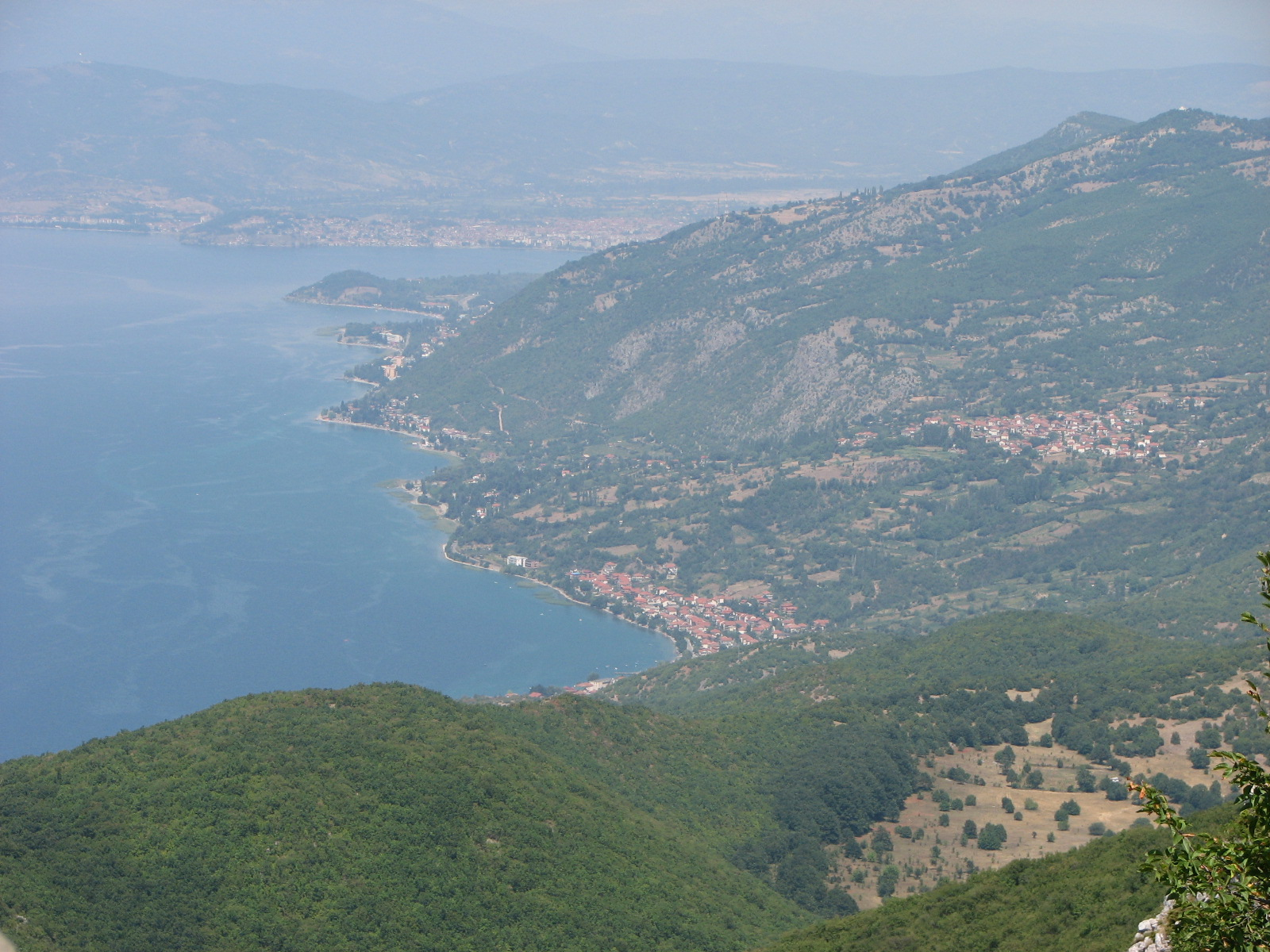
- Peštani and surrounding area as seen from Galičica

- Location within North Macedonia
- Coordinates: 41°00′55″N 20°48′39″E
- Country: North Macedonia
- Region: Southwestern
- Municipality: Ohrid

Population (2002)
  - Total: 1,326
- Time zone: UTC+1 (CET)

Peštani (Macedonian: Пештани) is a village in the municipality of Ohrid, North Macedonia, located 12 kilometres south of the city of Ohrid. It is a popular beachside town along Lake Ohrid and lies at the foot of Galičica National Park. Originally a fishing village, it now gets most of its income from tourism.

== History ==
At the beginning of the 20th century the village was a homestead owned by a landlord. The houses of the natives were built on his land and that is why they paid an annual fee of 13 groschen per house and a certain amount of firewood.

The "La Macédoine et sa Population Chrétienne" survey by Dimitar Mishev (D. Brankov) concluded that the Christian part of the local population in 1905 was composed of 720 Bulgarian Exarchists. There was a Bulgarian school in the beginning of 20th century.

== Demographics ==
Traditionally Peštani is inhabited by Orthodox Macedonians and in the Ottoman period by a small Turkish minority.

In statistics gathered by Vasil Kanchov in 1900, the village of Peštani was inhabited by 560 Bulgarian Christians and 50 Muslim Bulgarians. The chief Bulgarian teacher in the region of Ohrid, Yakim Derebanov wrote in his report from 1905 that there were 110 Bulgarian houses in the village, inhabited by 640 Bulgarian Christians and 16 Turkish houses, inhabited by 70 Turks-Muslims. There was a tendency for emigration of the local Turks.

By 1920, the Turks of Peštani (Turkish: Peştan) sold their houses and fields, some arable, moving to Ohrid where a few families live today known as Peştanlı. Elderly inhabitants of Peštani relate that the Turks of the village were not Islamised Slavs or Albanians, but of pure Ottoman Turkish stock and local traditions are absent about any Islamisation of local Slavic population.

According to the 2002 census, the village had a total of 1,326 inhabitants. Ethnic groups in the village include:

- Macedonians 1319
- Serbs 1
- Others 6
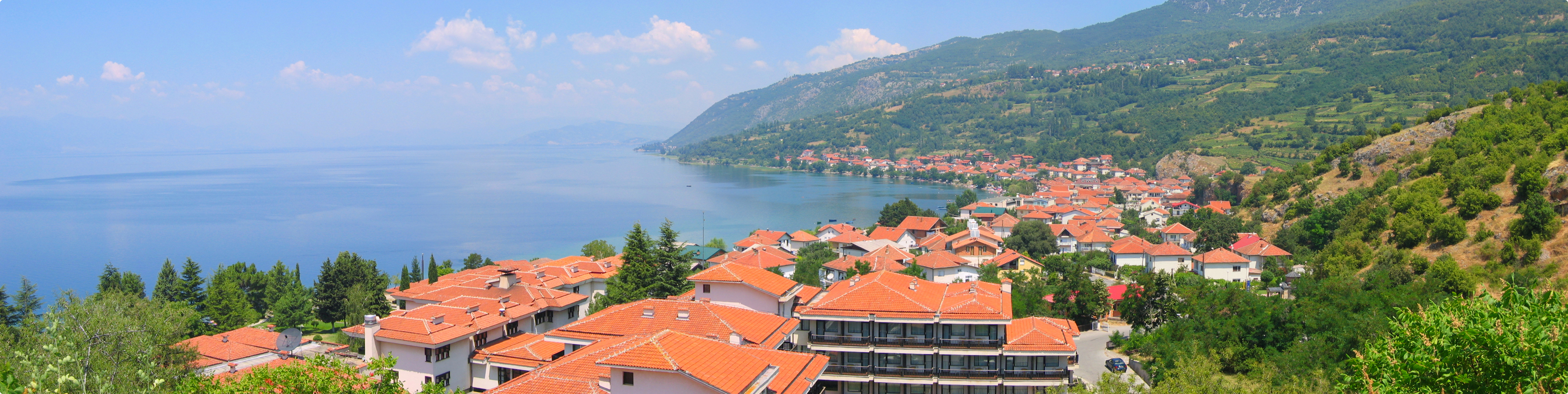
Panorama of Peštani.
