= Galičica =

Mountain between North Macedonia and Albania

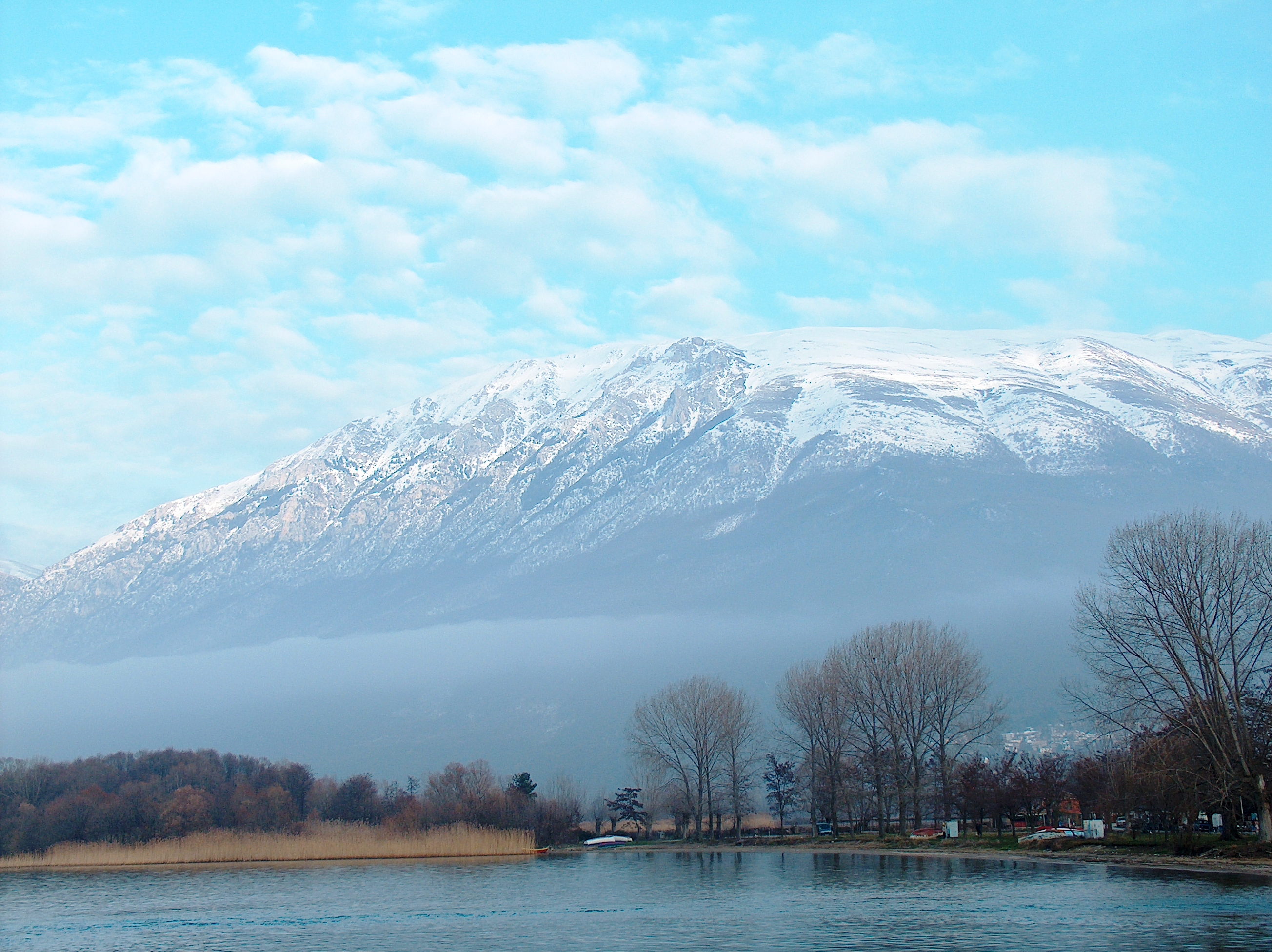
Galičica Mountain from St. Naum Monastery

Galičica (Macedonian: Галичица, Albanian: Mali i Thatë) is a mountain situated across the border between North Macedonia and Albania. North Macedonia's side of the mountain is designated as a national park (Galičica National Park), positioned between the country's two largest lakes: Lake Ohrid and Lake Prespa, covering an area of 227 square kilometres (88 sq mi). Rising to 2,265 metres above sea level, the mountain features varied terrain with steep slopes and significant elevational differences, creating diverse ecological zones dominated by forests and pastures.

Since the 1950s, the landscape has undergone notable transformations, with forested areas increasing from 40% to 58% by 2007, while pasturelands decreased from 50% to 24% due to changing human activities. The mountain harbours exceptional biodiversity, with 180 woody plant taxa (56% of North Macedonia's dendroflora) and distinctive grassland communities that support numerous rare and endemic species. Human influence varies across the mountain, with Lake Ohrid shoreline settlements transitioning from agriculture to tourism, while Prespa-side communities have experienced population decline and land abandonment. Galičica's unique position between two major lakes, its limestone geology, and modified Mediterranean climate have allowed it to function as a refugial area during glacial periods, contributing to its current biological richness and its role as an important biogeographical boundary for several plant species.

== Geography and characteristics ==
The mountain features varied terrain with relatively steep slopes and considerable elevational differences. These natural characteristics have led to the development of diverse vegetation zones, primarily dominated by forests and pastures. The region's geological composition, climate, hydrological conditions, and soil composition have all influenced the evolution of its distinctive flora. Only a small portion of the land has been adapted for agricultural cultivation by humans, with the majority remaining as natural forest and pasture landscapes. There are roughly 23 populated areas on the mountain, with around 10,000 inhabitants. Out of the 38,000 hectares of land, about 6,000 hectares have historically been used for agricultural purposes, primarily as fields and orchards.

Galičica Mountain reaches 2,265 metres above sea level, with its highest zones concentrated in the southern portion known as Stara Galičica (Old Galičica). Research conducted in the 1990s identified two glacial cirques in this area: an upper one with its floor at 2,030–2,070 metres and a lower one at 1,850–1,900 metres. The true natural tree line on the mountain has been significantly altered by human activity, having been artificially lowered by about 500 metres. Evidence for this includes isolated pine trees (Pinus peuce) found at elevations up to 2,150 metres near the Magaro peak (2,254 m), while the current forest line averages around 1,600 metres, reaching its highest point of 1,880 metres on the northern slopes.

The high-mountain region of Galičica shows distinct asymmetry in its ecological characteristics between different slope aspects. Periglacial landforms, which are characteristic features of high mountain environments, appear at different elevations depending on aspect: sliding blocks occur down to 1,850 meters on the northwestern slopes, while grass terraces extend to 1,900 meters on the northeastern slopes. These variations reflect the influence of local factors such as exposure to moist air masses, differences in precipitation received by various mountain sides, and thermal conditions created by different slope aspects. Together with the first high-mountain zone primarily covered by extensive grasslands, these features define Galičica's unique alpine character.

== Land use changes and transformations ==
Major transformations in land use on Galičica Mountain have been documented between the 1950s and 2007. These changes reflect both natural succession processes and anthropogenic influences. One of the most distinct changes has been the increase in forested areas, which expanded from about 40% of the total land area in the 1950s to 58% by 2007. This growth primarily resulted from natural succession, particularly as shrubland matured into forest. Conversely, pasturelands have significantly decreased from 50% of the total area in the 1950s to just 24% by 2007. This reduction correlates with the abandonment of traditional cattle breeding practices as local economies shifted toward tourism and service industries. Areas covered by short-stemmed vegetation and shrubs decreased from 14% in the 1970s to 5% in 2007, primarily due to their succession into forested areas as part of natural ecological progression.

== Human impact and regional differences ==
The human influence on Galičica's landscape varies geographically and has changed over time. Settlements along the Lake Ohrid shoreline—including Konjsko, Peštani, Trpejca, and Ljubaništa—have experienced population growth but decreasing agricultural land use. These communities have largely transitioned from agricultural activities to tourism, trade, and other service industries. Even as their populations increased, their arable lands were transformed into non-agricultural uses such as housing, buildings, yards, religious structures, and cemeteries. In contrast, settlements on the Prespa side of the mountain, such as Oteševo, Leskoec, Petrino, Preljubje, and Stipona, have undergone significant population decline due to migration to urban areas and abroad. This demographic shift has led to the abandonment of arable fields, which gradually transform through natural succession. Overall, human pressure on the landscape has increased in the coastal areas of both lakes while significantly decreasing in the mountain interior, where human presence is now primarily limited to recreational and tourist visits.

== Factors and causes of land transformation ==
The transformation of Galičica's landscape has been driven by a complex interplay of social, economic, and natural factors. The declaration of Galičica as a national park, changing patterns of physical planning, urbanisation, industrialisation, and infrastructure development have all contributed to altering land use. Cultural and educational changes, historical settlement patterns, and the functional organisation of territories have further influenced these transformations. Economically, the shift from primary agricultural activities toward secondary and tertiary sectors has been particularly influential, along with changes in energy use and traditional farming practices. These social and economic changes have coincided with natural processes, especially the succession of vegetation communities whereby abandoned agricultural lands and pastures gradually develop into shrublands and eventually forests. Climate factors on both local and global scales have also played a role in these transformations. Research on these changes has been conducted using topographic maps from the 1950s and 1970s, compared with Google satellite imagery from 2007, all analysed using Geographic Information System (GIS) technology.

== Biodiversity ==
Galičica Mountain is characterized by considerable biological diversity, with its dry grasslands serving as a crucial habitat for many rare and endangered plant species. Research conducted between 2009–2010 identified a distinctive grassland community called Siderito montanae-Trifolietum dalmaticae, which flourishes on the carbonate substrate on both the Ohrid and Prespa sides of the mountain. These grassland ecosystems developed as secondary formations following the degradation of original forest vegetation through grazing, burning, and other human activities in the oak and lower beech forest zones at elevations of 700–1200 metres.

The floristic composition of Galičica's dry grasslands reflects the influence of the modified Mediterranean climate that characterizes the region. Analysis reveals a rich phytogeographic structure with Eurimediterranean floral elements (35%) dominating, followed by Eurasian (28%) and Balkan (17%) elements. Several rare endemic plants grow in these habitats, including Erodium guicciardii, which was first discovered in Macedonia on Galičica Mountain, and is found alongside other species like Minuartia glomerata subsp. macedonica, Centaurea grisebachii, and Verbascum longifolium subsp. pannosum. The mountain's position between two major lakes, its limestone geology, and its mild pleasant climate allowed it to function as a refugial area during glacial periods, contributing to its current exceptional biodiversity.

Galičica Mountain harbors an exceptionally rich dendroflora (woody plants), with research conducted between 1995 and 2018 documenting 180 different tree and woody plant taxa, representing 56% of North Macedonia's entire dendroflora. This diversity includes trees (42.2%), shrubs (34.5%), half-shrubs (14%), lianas (7.7%), and semiparasitic epiphytes (1.6%). The mountain's unique position between Lakes Ohrid and Prespa, its limestone geology, and the influence of modified Mediterranean climate have created ideal conditions for numerous rare and endemic species. Particularly noteworthy is the Balkan and sub-Balkan endemic floristic element, comprising 23 species (12.8%) of the mountain's woody plants. Several rare species can be found only on Galičica or at most one or two other mountains in Macedonia, including Prunus prostrata, Genista radiata, Pinus heldreichii, Euphorbia veneta, and Aesculus hippocastanum. The mountain also serves as an important biogeographical boundary for several species, marking the southernmost distribution limit for some (like Juniperus sabina and Pinus peuce) and the northernmost limit for others (such as Acantholimon ulicinum and Prunus prostrata).

== Gallery ==
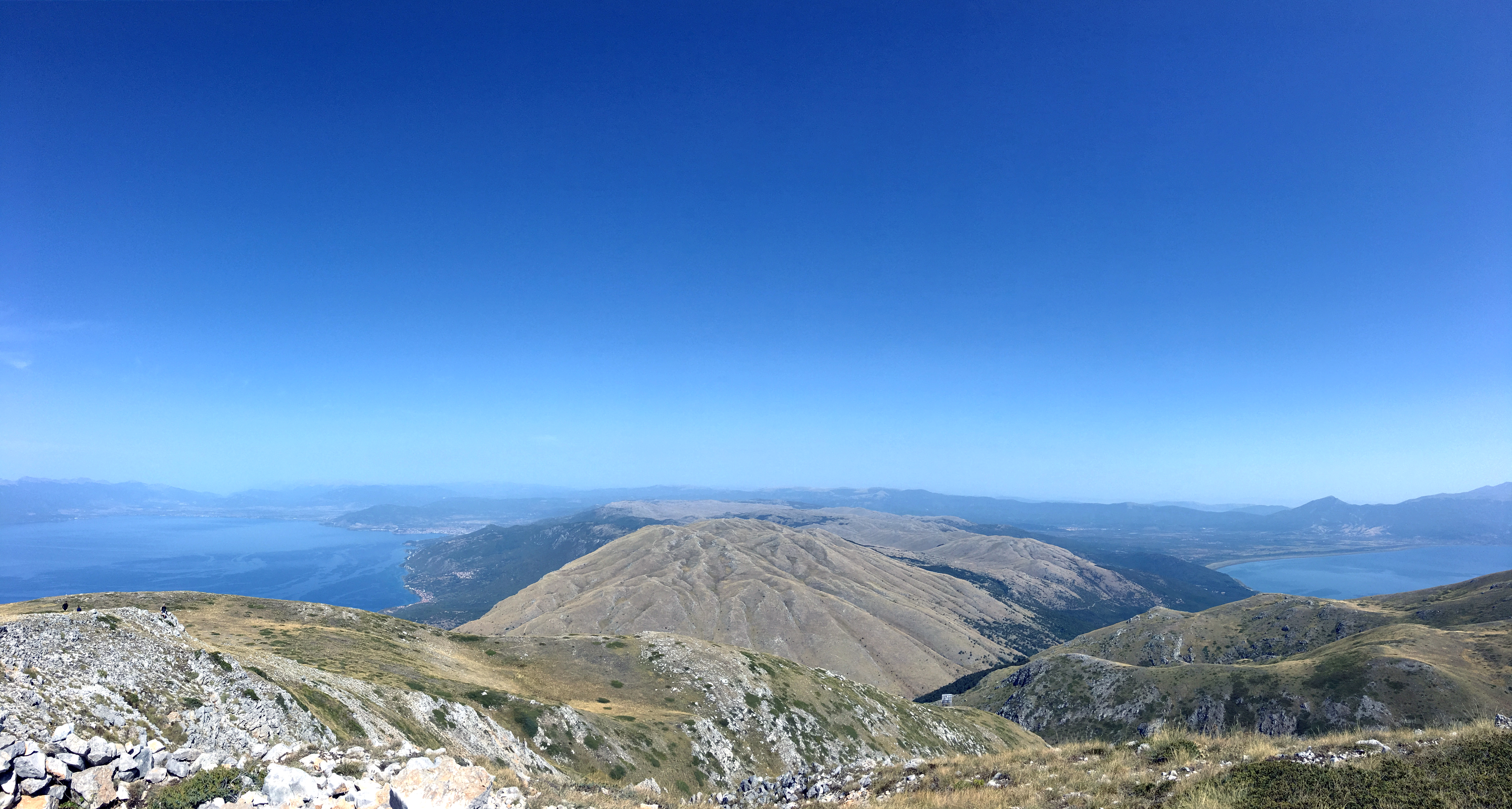
View of Ohrid Lake and Prespa Lake from top of Galičica

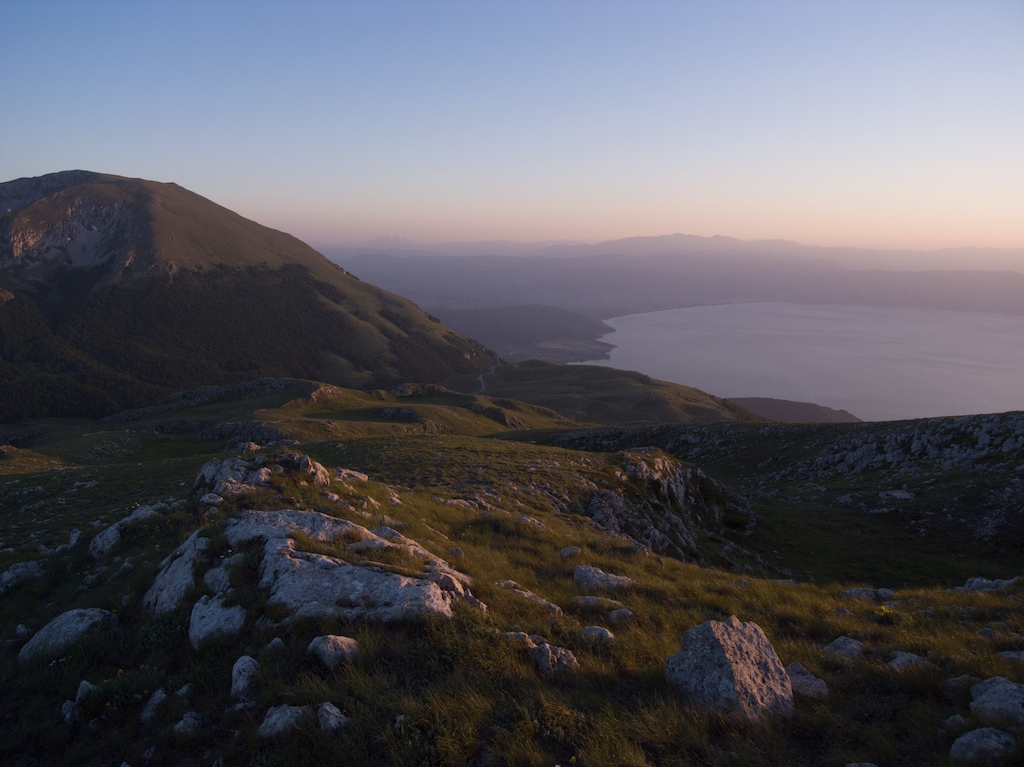
View from Galičica on the south part of Ohrid lake

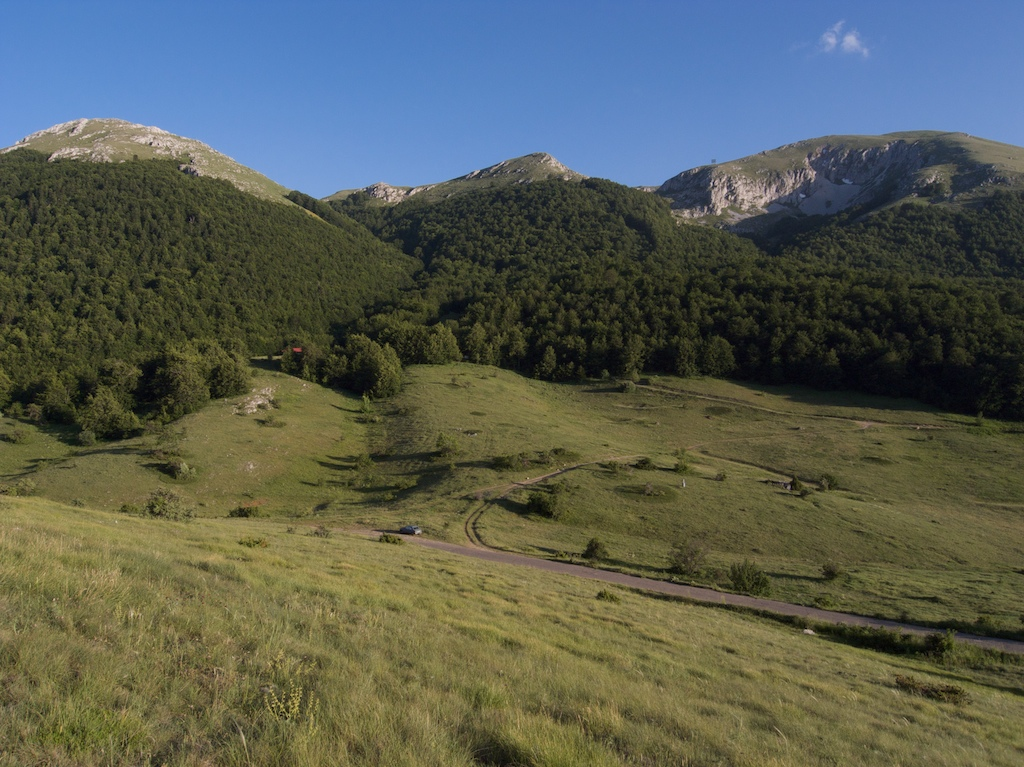
Road pass through Galičica

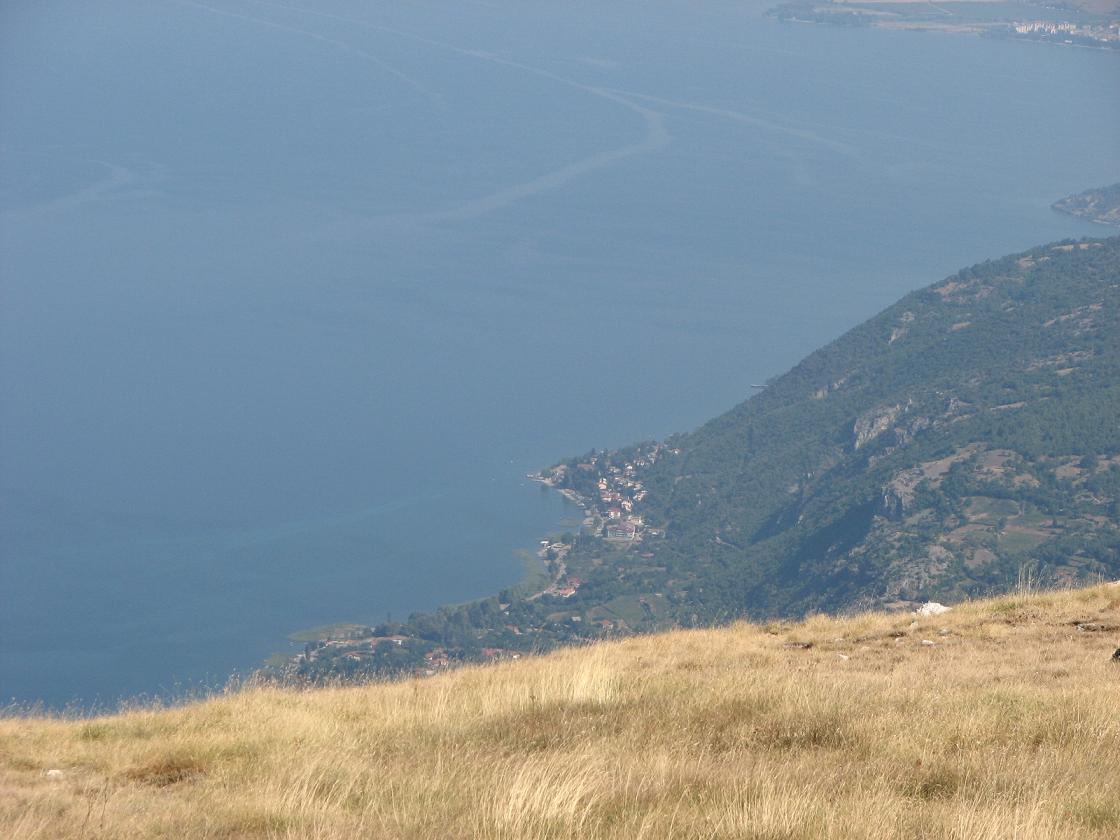
View from Galičica on the north part of Ohrid lake

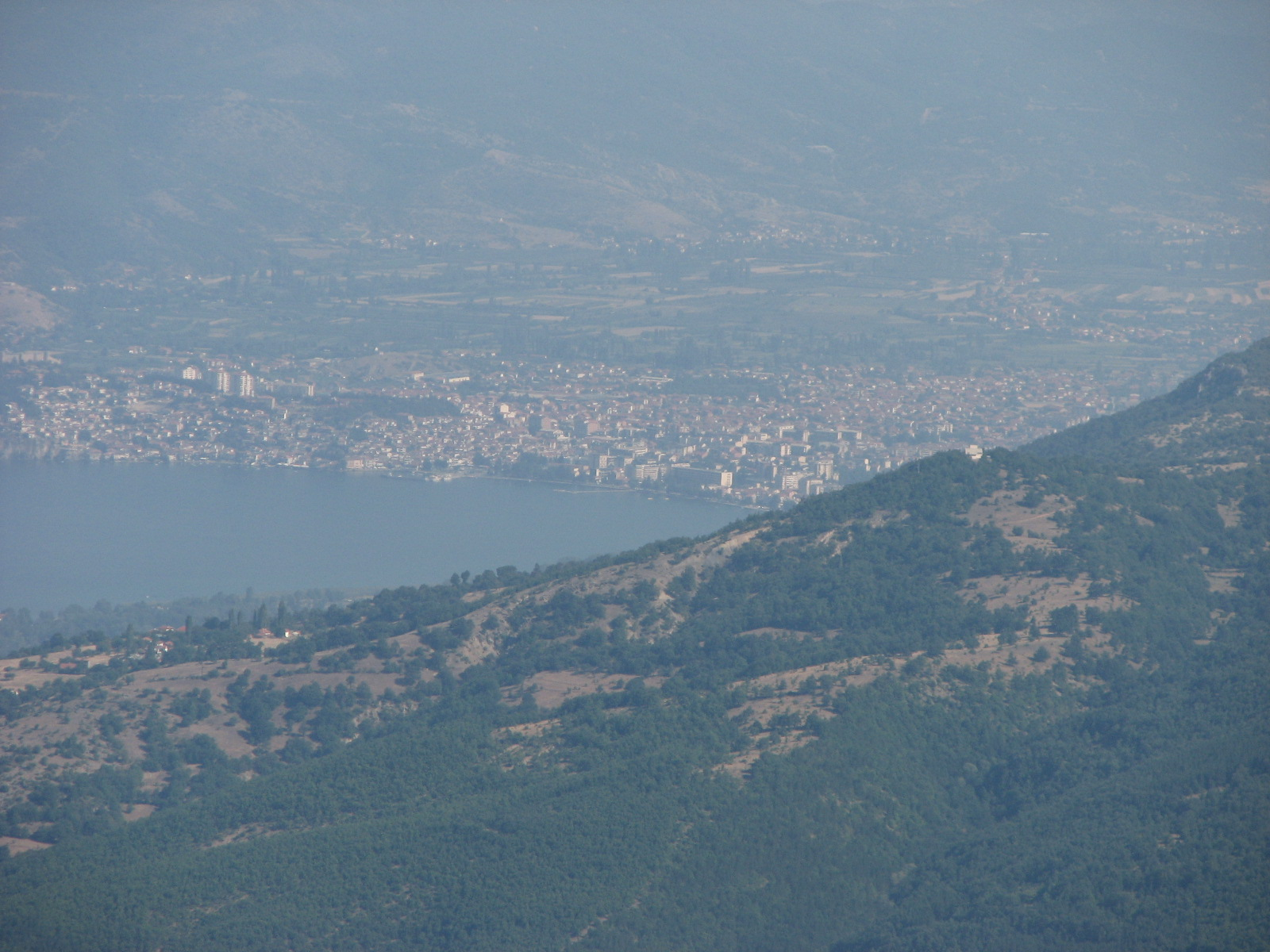
View from Galičica on Ohrid town

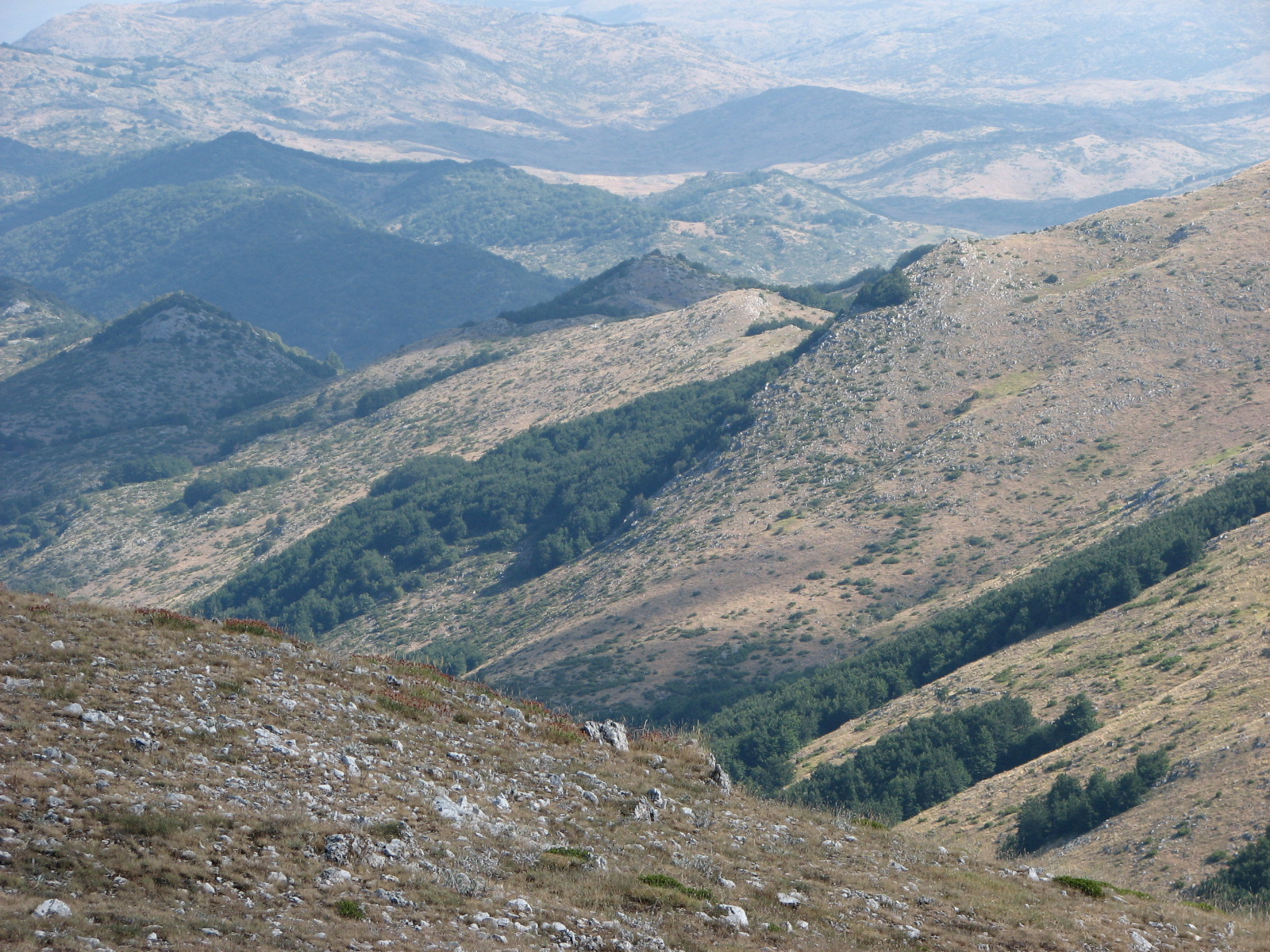
The interior of mountain Galičica

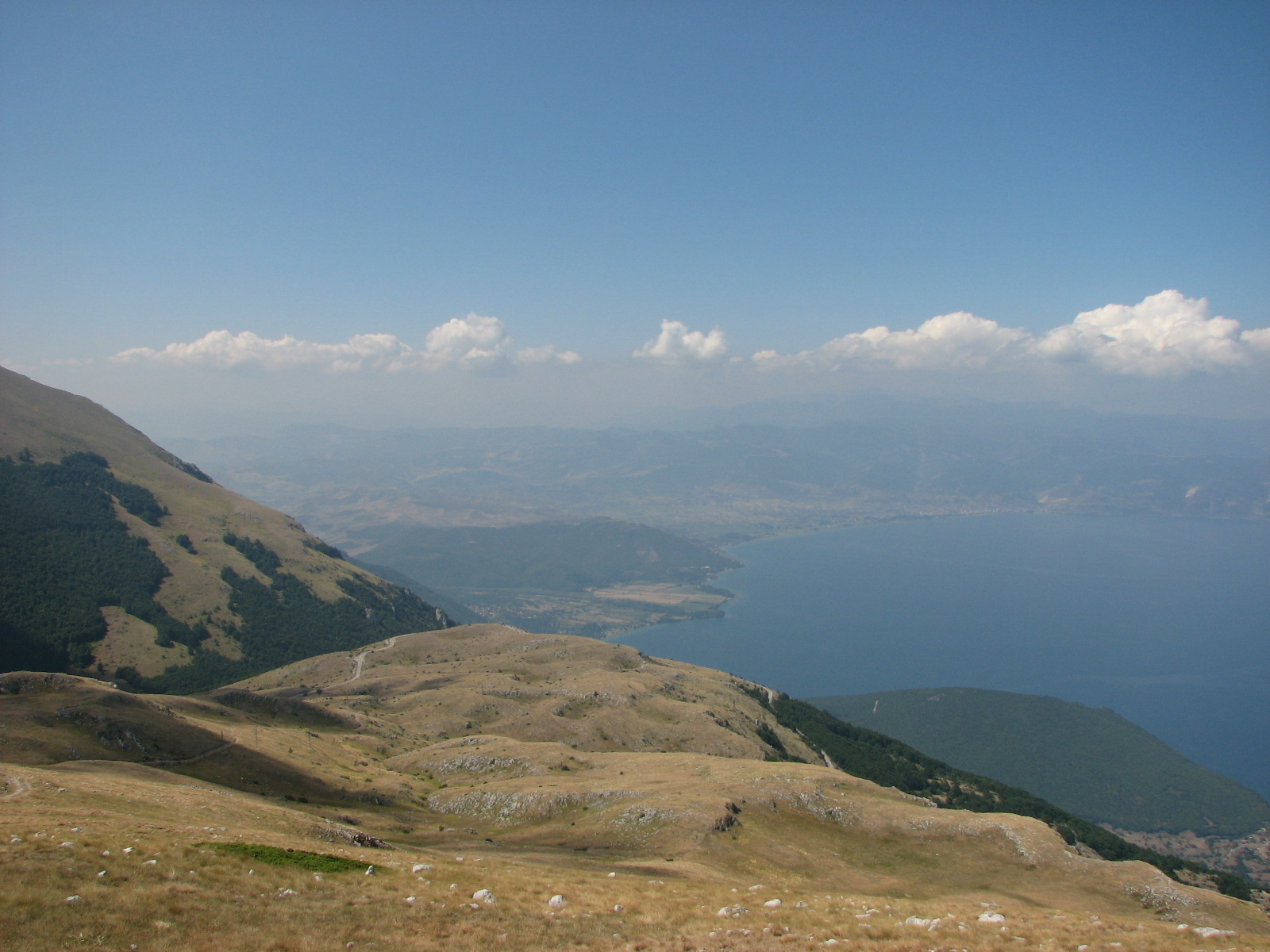
View from Galičica on the south part of Ohrid lake

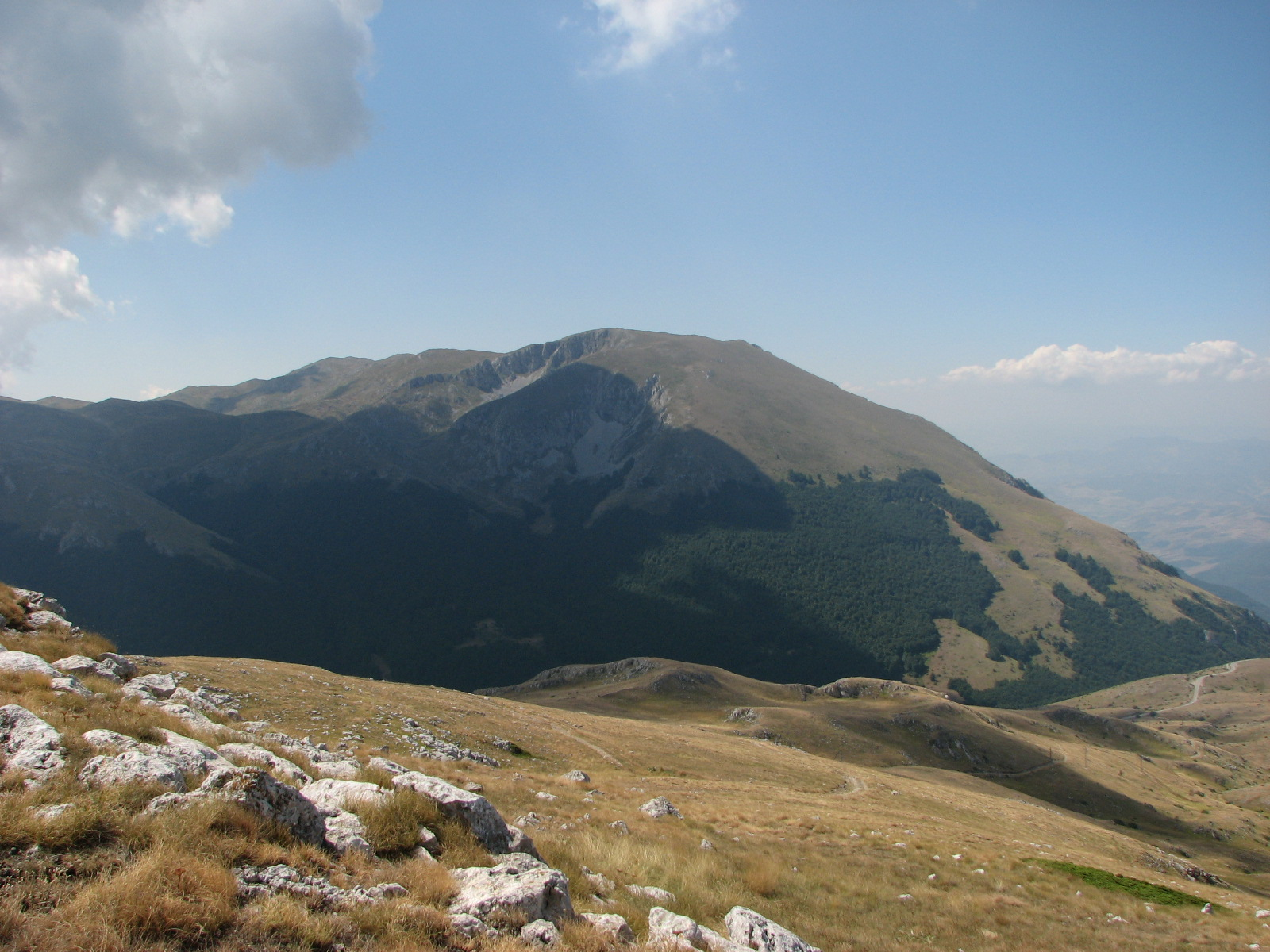
Highest peak, Magaro (2255 m)

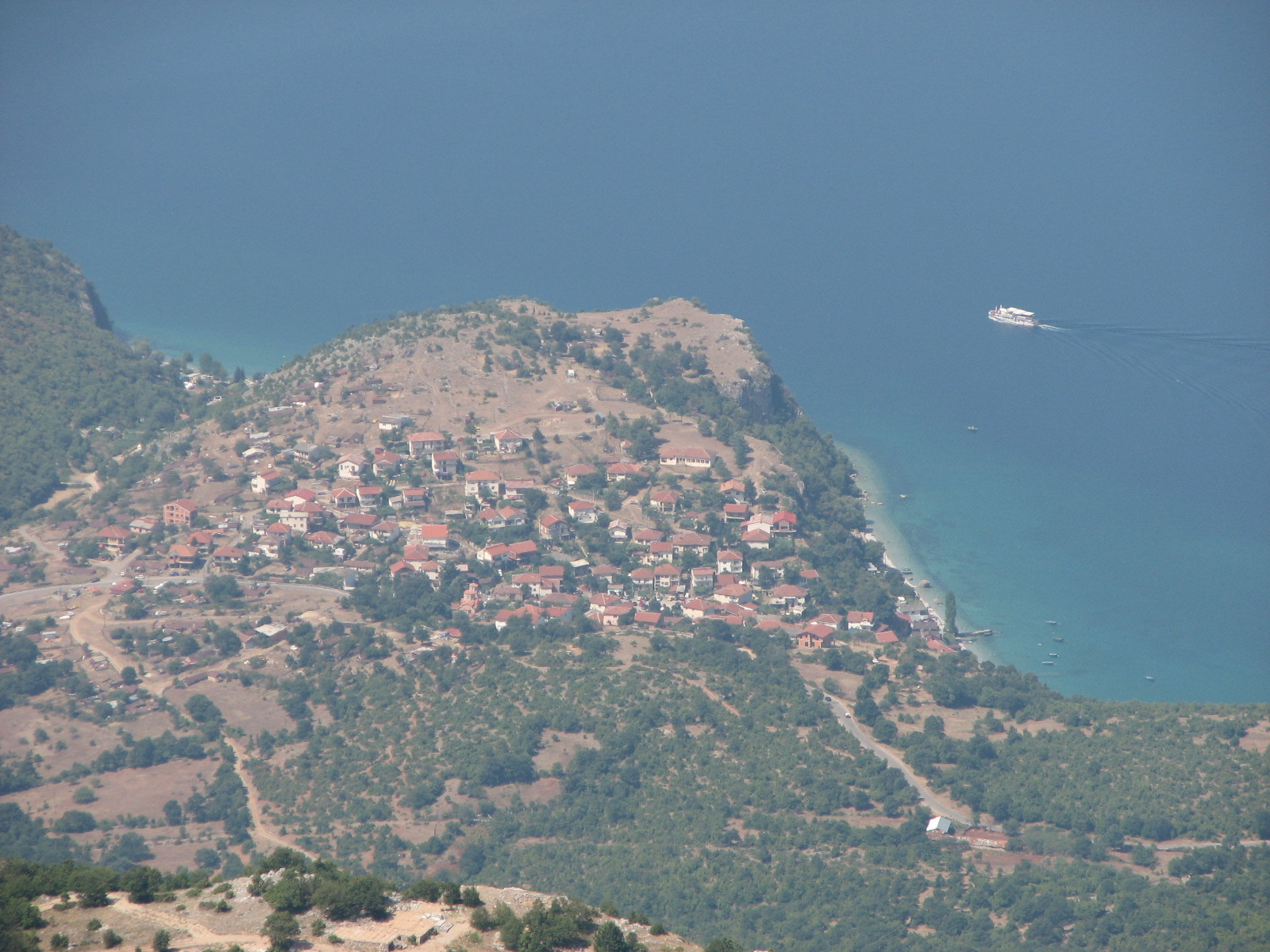
View from Galičica on the village of Trpejca

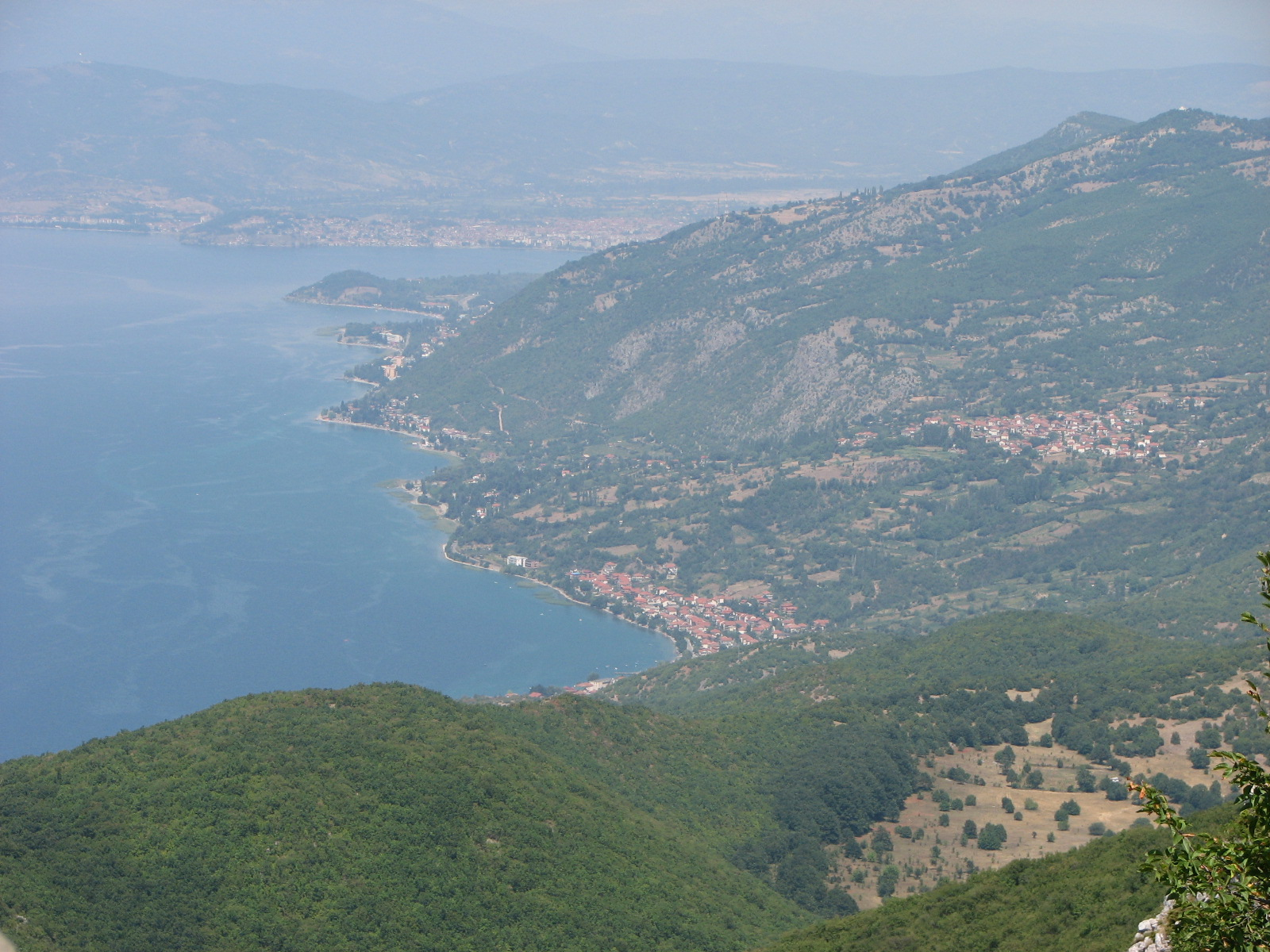
View from Galičica on the east coast of Ohrid lake

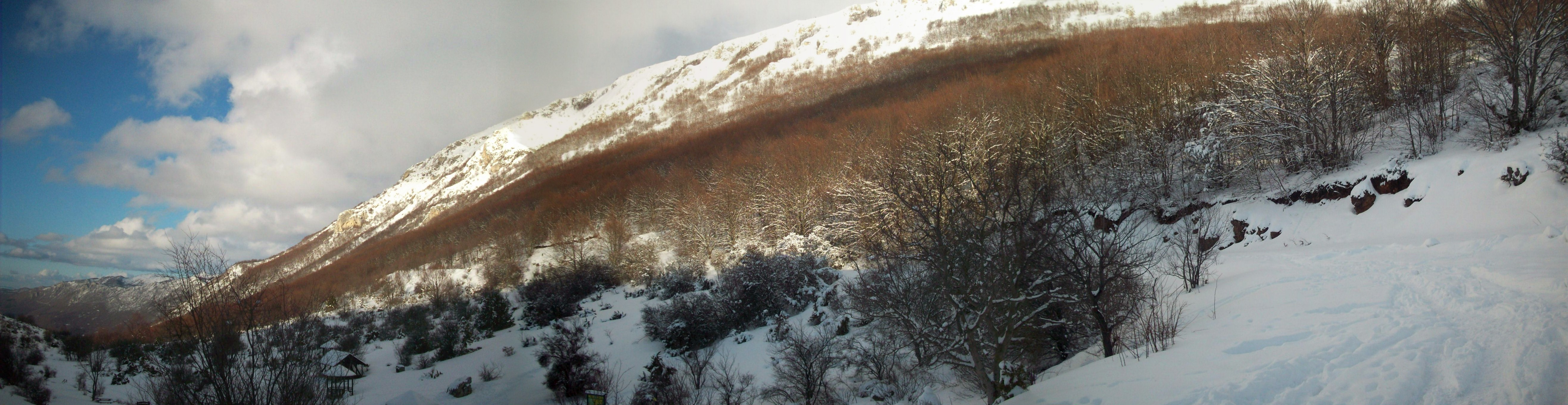
View from Korita

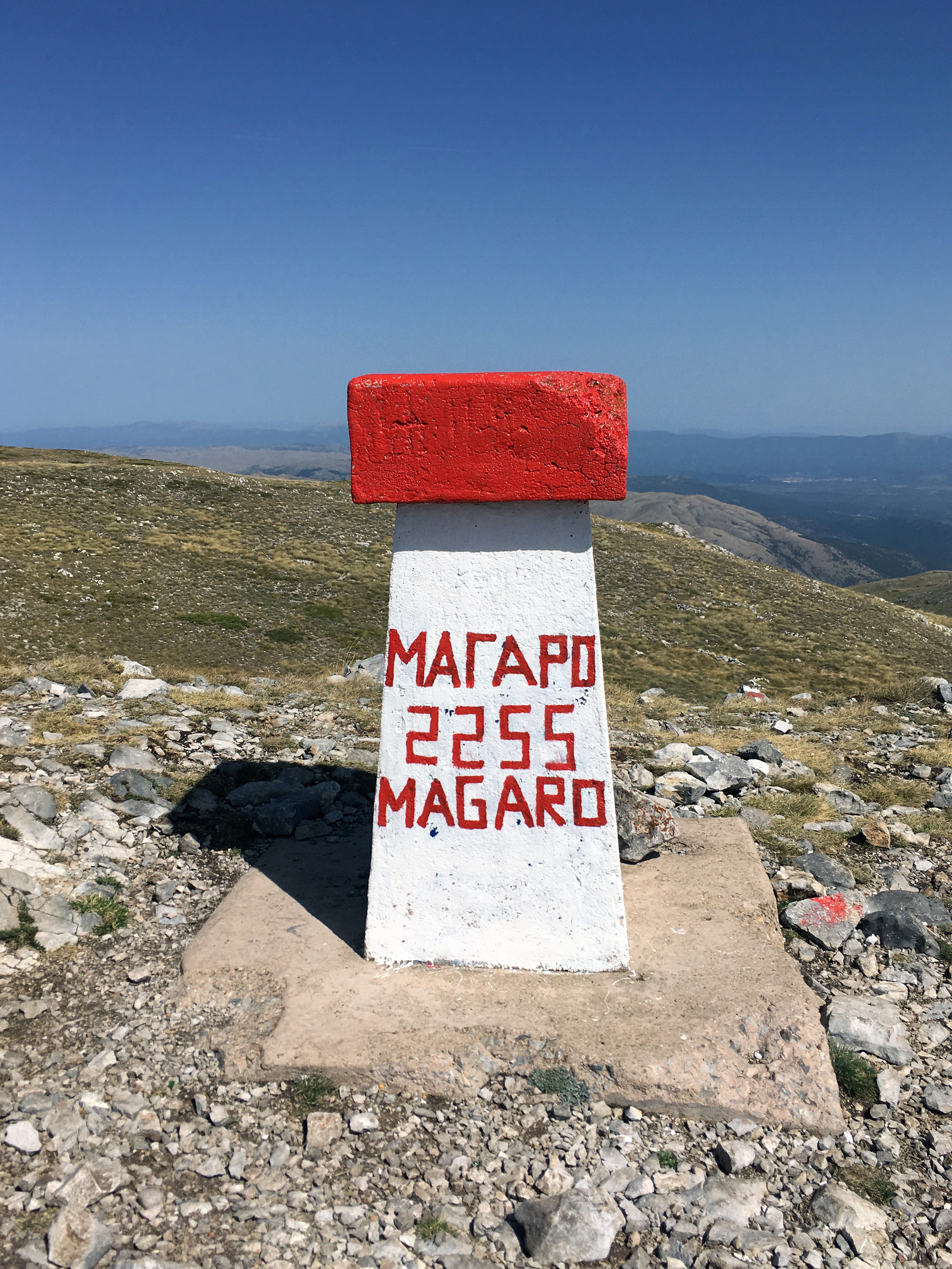
Magaro Peak, 2255 m

== See also ==
- Mali i Thatë
