= Kosel, North Macedonia =

Kosel Косел
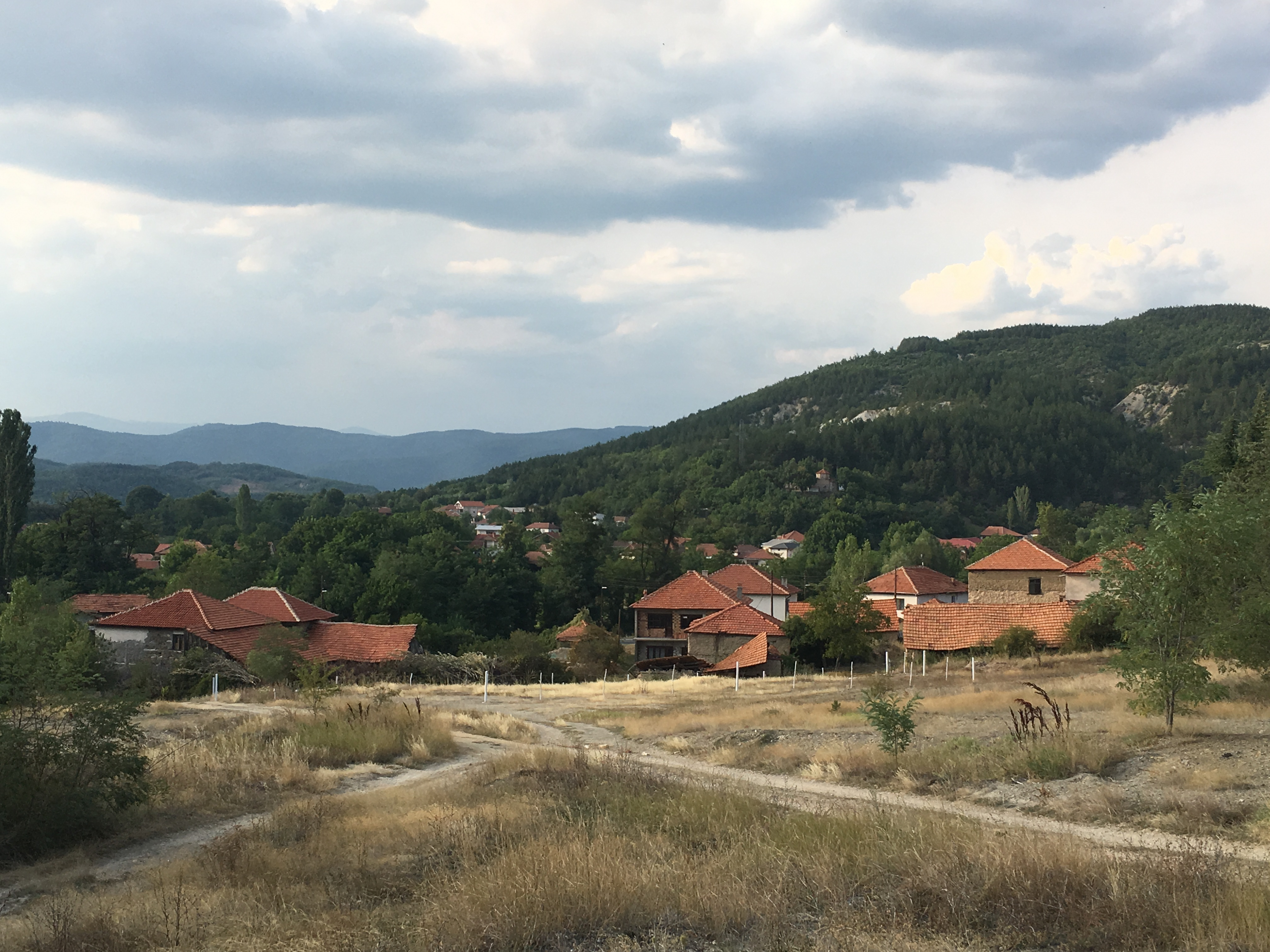
- View of Kosel

- Location within North Macedonia
- Coordinates: 41°10′N 20°50′E
- Country: North Macedonia
- Region: Southwestern
- Municipality: Ohrid

Population (2021)
  - Total: 566
- Time zone: UTC+1 (CET)

Kosel (Macedonian: Косел) is a village in the municipality of Ohrid, North Macedonia.

The village is known for its proximity to the extinct volcano Duvalo, which gives the village and its surroundings a permanent sulfuric scent.

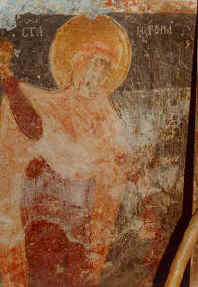
Painting in the Church of St. Nicholas in Kosel

The population of Kosel Municipality, which merged with Ohrid Municipality in 2002, was 1,369.

== Demographics ==
As of the 2021 census, Kosel had 566 residents with the following ethnic composition:

- Macedonians 553
- Persons for whom data are taken from administrative sources 9
- Others 4

According to the 2002 census, the village had a total of 586 inhabitants. Ethnic groups in the village include:

- Macedonians 576
- Serbs 6
- Others 4

== Sports ==
Local football club FK Vulkan plays in the OFS Ohrid league.
