= North Macedonian passport =

Passport issued to citizens of North Macedonia

- Front covers of the five biometric passport types

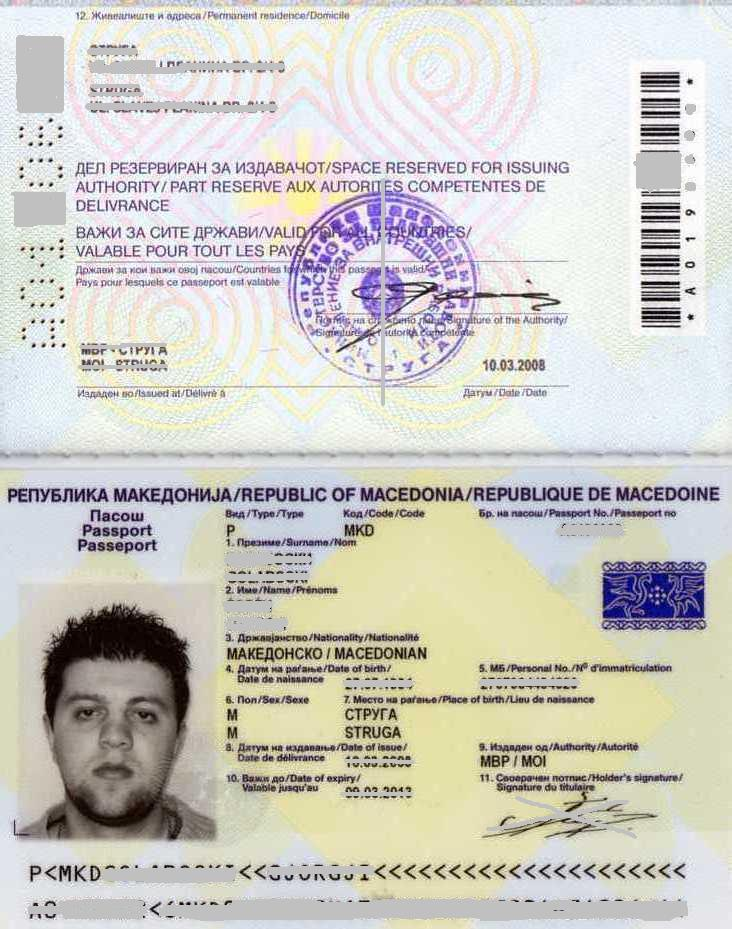
- Integrated biodata card of a pre-2019 biometric passport
- Type: Passport
- Issued by: North Macedonia
- Purpose: Identification
- Eligibility: Citizenship of North Macedonia
- Expiration: 5 years for persons 4 years of age to 27; 10 years for those 27 years of age and older 2 years for children under the age of 4.

The North Macedonian passport (Macedonian: Пасош на Северна Македонија, Pasoš na Severna Makedonija, Albanian: Pasaporta e Maqedonisë së Veriut) is a travel document issued to citizens of North Macedonia for the purpose of international travel. Passports are issued by the Ministry of the Interior. The validity of the passport is 5 years for persons 4 to 27 years of age and 10 years for those 27 years of age and older. For children ages four and under, the validity of the passport is limited to two years. The passports conform to the recommended standards (size, composition, layout, technology) of the International Civil Aviation Organization (ICAO), and are biometric passports.

== History ==
Stamp added to old-design passports since 2019, displaying the newly accepted country name in Macedonian, English, and French

From 1945 to 1991, when present-day North Macedonia was a constituent republic of Yugoslavia, citizens traveled with Yugoslav passports. Under the Yugoslav federal system, each republic had its own variety of passport; in particular, Yugoslav passports issued in SR Macedonia were printed in Macedonian and French, rather than in Serbo-Croatian.

The first post-independence passports were issued in 1991. The design and contents have changed over the years. The first generation passports were blue with a silver color inscription without an emblem. The second generation of passports had a golden inscription on the cover and the third generation had the national coat of arms added. The first three generations had only "Република Мaкедонија" and the English translation "Republic of Macedonia" inscribed on the front cover. The fourth generation passport became red with the French translation of the official country name, "République de Macédoine," added above and "Passeport" below the coat of arms. It was a biometric passport which contained a RFID chip, enabling the storage of biometric and other retrievable data. Previously issued, non-biometric passports remain valid until their stated dates of expiration.

Effective 16 November 2009, the five-pointed red star that had been part of the national coat of arms was removed from the emblem.

After the Prespa Agreement ending the naming dispute with Greece come into effect in February 2019, passports were stamped with the country's new name as an interim measure before new passports were issued. "This passport is property of the Republic of North Macedonia" appears on the trilingual stamp in English, French, and Macedonian. The authorities began issuing the passports with the new country name starting from 1 July 2021 (postponed from September 2020). Old name passports remained valid until 12 February 2024.

== Physical appearance ==
North Macedonian passports are burgundy in colour with the national coat of arms emblazoned in the centre of the front cover. The Macedonian words "Република Северна Македонија", optionally followed by the Albanian version "Republika e Maqedonisë së Veriut," the Turkish version "Kuzey Makedonya Cumhuriyeti," or any other recognized minority languages, as well as the English "Republic of North Macedonia" and the French "République de Macédoine du Nord" are inscribed above the coat of arms. The words "ПАСОШ," "PASAPORTË," "PASAPORT", "PASSPORT," and "PASSEPORT" are inscribed below. The passports have the standard biometric symbol at the bottom of the front cover. They contain 32 pages, with the critical information both printed on the data page and stored in the chip.

== Integrated biodata card and signature page ==
Each passport has an integrated biodata card. An integrated biodata card has a visual zone and a machine-readable zone. The visual zone has a digitized photograph of the passport holder, data about the passport, and data about the passport holder:

- Type [of document, which is "P" for ordinary passports]
- Code [for the issuing state, which is "MKD" for North Macedonia]
- Passport No.
- Surname (Macedonian Cyrillic Transcription with ICAO Standardized Transcription/Translation underneath)
- Name
- Nationality: македонско/граѓанин на Република Северна Македонија, Macedonian/citizen of the Republic of North Macedonia
- Date of birth (DD.MM.YYYY format)
- Unique Master Citizen Number (EMBG)
- Sex
- Place of birth
- Date of issue
- Authority [which is “MBP/MOI” – Ministry of Interior]
- Date of expiry
- Holder’s signature
- Holder's portrait
- Permanent residence

The integrated biodata card has a line for the signature of a passport holder. The non-biometric passports of the first three generations were not valid until they were signed by the holder. If a holder was unable to sign, it was to be signed by a person who had the legal authority to sign on their behalf. The new biometric passports only require a signature made with a digital pen on a tablet on the day of application, after which, the image of the signature is printed on the first page along with the other data and cannot be altered thereafter.

At the bottom of an integrated biodata card is the machine-readable zone, which can be read both visually and by an optical scanner. The machine-readable zone consists of two lines. There are no blank spaces in either line. A space which does not contain a letter or a number is filled with a "<". The first line of a machine-readable zone of a passport contains a letter to denote the type of travel document ("P" for passport), the code for the issuing state (e.g., "MKD" for North Macedonia), and the name (surname first, then name) of the passport holder.

The second line of the machine-readable zone contains the passport number, supplemented by a check digit; the code of the nationality of the passport holder ("MKD" for North Macedonia); the date of birth of the passport holder (two digit year, two digit month, two digit day i.e. 800509), supplemented by a check digit; the sex of the passport holder ("M" or "F"); the date of expiry of the passport, supplemented by a check digit; the holder’s personal number, supplemented by a check digit; and, at the end of the line, an overall check digit.

== Types of passports ==
- Regular (Ordinary) passports - Issued to all citizens of North Macedonia. It has a red color and is valid for two, five, or ten years depending on the age of the applicant. These passports are not extendable or renewable and a new one must be obtained once expired.
- Diplomatic passports - Issued to diplomats accredited overseas and their eligible dependents and to citizens who reside in North Macedonia and travel abroad for diplomatic work. The title and function of the bearer (Diplomat) is listed on the integrated biodata card in addition to the information already contained. It is valid for five years.
- Official passports – Issued to government employees assigned overseas, government employees working at the Ministry of Foreign Affairs, or at a diplomatic mission abroad. An official passport can also be issued to other government officials that are to travel abroad, with prior approval, as well as to their spouses and children living in the same household. The title and function of the bearer (Official) is listed on the integrated biodata card in addition to the information already contained. It is valid for five years.
- Temporary passports - Issued to citizens who need to return to the country from abroad and have extenuating circumstances such as a lost or stolen passport. When issued, it is valid for 30 days or until the return trip is completed. It can be issued at an embassy or consulate abroad.

== Documents required ==
The following documents are required to obtain a passport:

- Passport Application Form (Obtained from the MOI or downloaded from their website)
- Valid State Issued ID (If citizen resides abroad, he/she needs to submit the foreign ID in order to prove identity)
- Old passport (if applicable, regardless of expiry date)
- 300 MKD Administrative Stamp (100 MKD for children 4 and under; 200 MKD for persons between the ages of 4 and 27).
- 2000 MKD Processing Fee (6100 MKD for expedited processing – usually passport requests are processed and completed in 48 hours)
- Picture, fingerprints, and all biometric data are collected at the Passport Application Centre(s); fingerprint data is not collected from minors ages 12 and under.

== Visa requirements map ==
Visa requirements for citizens of North Macedonia North Macedonia Visa free access Visa on arrival eVisa Visa available both on arrival or online Visa-free with voucher or letter of invitation Visa required

As of 2025, citizens of North Macedonia had visa-free or visa on arrival access to 133 countries and territories, ranking the North Macedonian passport 40th in the world according to Henley Passport Index

== Gallery of historic images ==
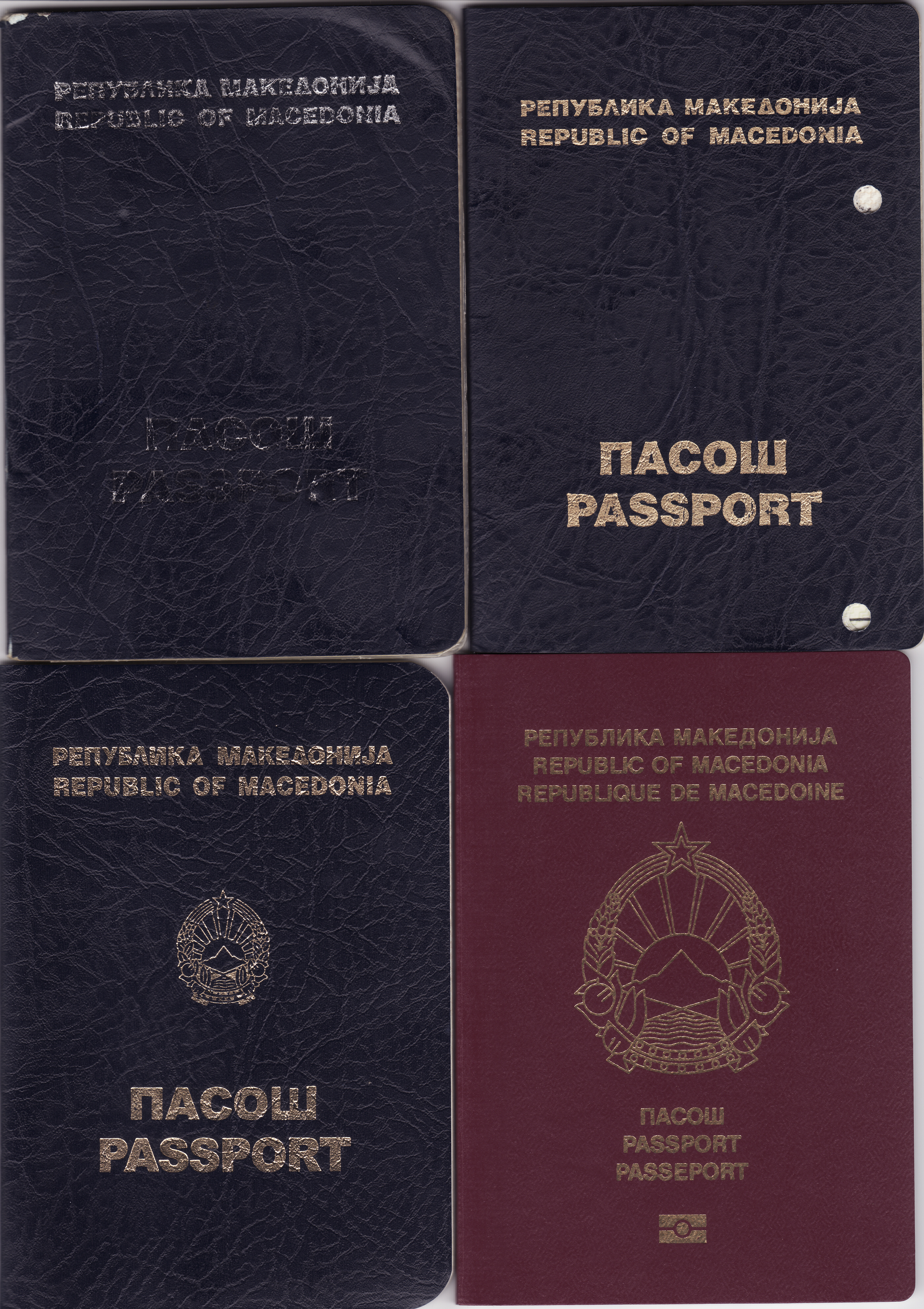
Passports (pre-2019) through the years: First generation passport (post-independence) (top left), second generation (top right), third generation (bottom left), and fourth generation passport (bottom right).

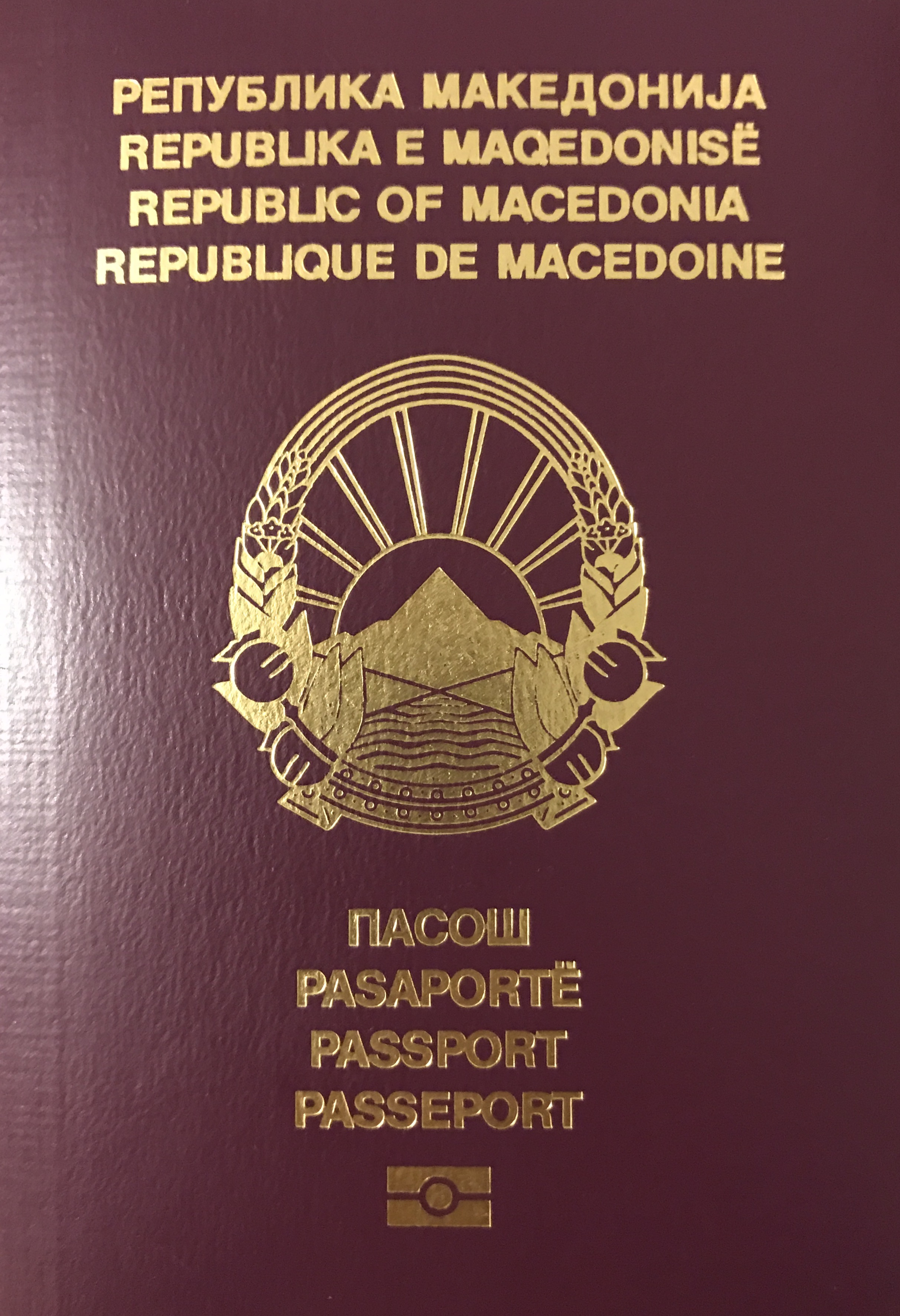
Pre-2019 biometric passport issued to citizens of Albanian descent

== See also ==
- Visa requirements for citizens of North Macedonia
- Identity card of North Macedonia
- Driving licence in North Macedonia
- Nationality law of North Macedonia
- Visa policy of North Macedonia

== Sources ==
- Republic of North Macedonia, Ministry of Foreign Affairs, Consular Services-Visa Regime
- Delta Visa & Passport Information
- Republic of North Macedonia, Ministry of Interior Administration, Travel Documents and Passports Law (in Macedonian)
- Republic of North Macedonia, Ministry of Interior Administration, Passport Application Form (in Macedonian)
- Republic of North Macedonia, Ministry of Interior Administration, Passport Application Procedures (in Macedonian)
