= Tourism in North Macedonia =

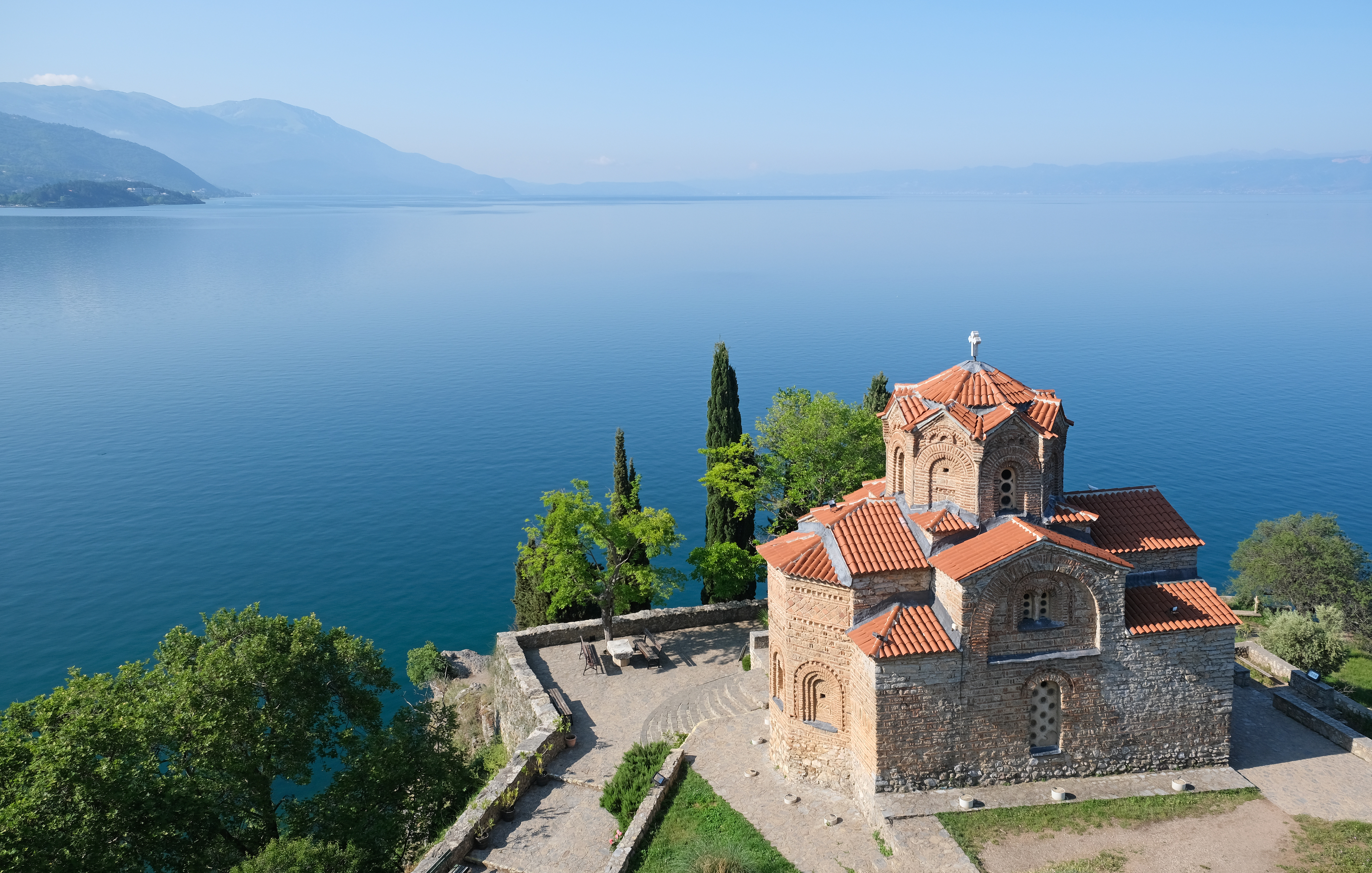
The Church of St. John at Kaneo overlooking Lake Ohrid

Tourism in North Macedonia is a large factor of the nation's economy. The country's large abundance of natural and cultural attractions make it suitable for tourism.

In 2019, North Macedonia received 1,184,963 tourist arrivals out of which 757,593 were foreign.

== Statistics ==
North Macedonia experiences a regular increase of visitors. The number of domestic tourists in the period from January to March 2008 increased by 23.5%, compared to the same period of the previous year. The number of foreign tourists in March 2008 increased by 44.7% compared to March 2007. In 2007, Lake Ohrid received about 250,000 domestic and foreign tourists.

In February 2009, the country received nearly 28,000 tourists, i.e., 3.2% more tourists than the same month last year, and there was also an 8% increase in the number of foreign visitors.

The summer of 2009 was the best tourist season for the city of Dojran with 135,000 overnight visitors, an increase of 12.5% compared to the previous year.

The number of tourists in May 2010 increased by 0.8% from the same month in the previous year.

The number of foreign tourists between January and July increased by 25% in 2011 compared to the same period in 2010. The average number of nights spent by the tourists increased by 33.2%.

In the first four months of 2012, the number of tourists in the country was 130,083, an increase of 4.6% from the previous year.

The region receiving the most tourist arrivals in 2012 was Southwest with 251,462 tourists, followed by Skopje (164,077) and Southeastern (106,978). The Pelagonia region received 72,054 arrivals, while the remaining regions each received under 30,000.

Among foreign tourists in 2012, most of the tourists came from Turkey (50,406), Greece (43,976), and Serbia (36,530). Outside the Balkans, 27,000 tourists came from the Netherlands. In 2019, most of the tourists came from Turkey (112,472), followed by Serbia (59,568), Greece (57,578), and Bulgaria (55,862). Poland (35,681) was the origin for most of the tourists outside the Balkans.

=== Arrivals by country ===
Most visitors arriving in North Macedonia on short term basis are from the following countries of nationality:

Rank	Country	2019	2018	2017	2016	2015
1	Turkey	▲112,472	▼111,667	▲129,708	▲105,738	90,857
2	Serbia	▲59,568	▲57,460	▲53,121	▲50,145	43,613
3	Greece	▲57,578	▼40,947	▲44,931	▲40,504	38,829
4	Bulgaria	▲55,862	▲52,659	▲45,958	▲36,982	29,314
5	Poland	▲35,681	▲34,575	▲22,281	▼12,268	17,054
6	Germany	▲34,342	▲30,173	▲23,544	▼17,067	17,939
7	Netherlands	▲31,481	▲27,918	▲26,889	▼23,960	32,217
8	Albania	27,311	▲27,311	▲21,194	▲20,862	18,493
9	Croatia	▲25,533	▲23,829	▲15,860	▼13,918	17,054
10	Kosovo	▲25,079	▲24,014	▲17,494	▲17,070	13,950
11	Romania	▲18,984	▲16,727	▲15,044	▲9,256	8,071
12	United States	▲18,285	▲17,916	▲15,163	▲11,495	10,186
13	Slovenia	▲17,953	▲16,890	▲12,815	▼9,971	11,463
14	Italy	▲13,757	▲13,403	▼11,124	▼11,515	12,444
15	China	▼13,635	▲13,724	▲9,435	▼6,565	7,256
16	Israel	▲12,436	▲10,767	▼7,967	▲8,983	4,754
17	United Kingdom	▼12,215	▲13,296	▲11,396	▲8,856	8,465
18	Sweden	▼11,188	▲11,530	▲8,557	▲6,495	5,617
19	Austria	▲10,481	▲9,014	▲8,367	▼7,387	8,602
20	Spain	▲10,184	▲6,303	▲6,012	▲3,659	3,151
21	Bosnia and Herzegovina	▲9,728	▲8,508	▲7,199	▲6,922	5,686
22	Belgium	▼9,698	▲9,966	▲7,499	▼5,501	5,509
23	Australia	▼9,511	▲9,701	▲8,228	▼5,557	6,625
24	France	▲9,445	▲9,030	▲8,008	▼6,231	7,603
25	Switzerland	▲8,622	▲8,098	▲6,437	▼4,589	4,815
Total foreign tourists		▲757,593	▲707,345	▲630,594	▲510,484	485,530

=== Arrivals by year ===
Tourist arrivals to North Macedonia have increased every year since 2010.

Year	Tourist Arrivals	Change (%)
2000	632,523	
2005	509,706	-19.5%
2010	586,241	+15.0%
2011	647,568	+10.5%
2012	663,633	+2.5%
2013	701,794	+5.8%
2014	735,650	+4.8%
2015	816,067	+10.9%
2016	856,843	+5.0%
2017	998,841	+16.6%
2018	1,126,935	+12.8%
2019	1,184,963	+5.1%
2020	467,514	-60.1%
2021	702,463	+50.3%
2022	969,277	+38.0%
2023	1,168,730	+20.6%
2024	1,260,425	+7.9%

== Destinations ==
=== Cities ===
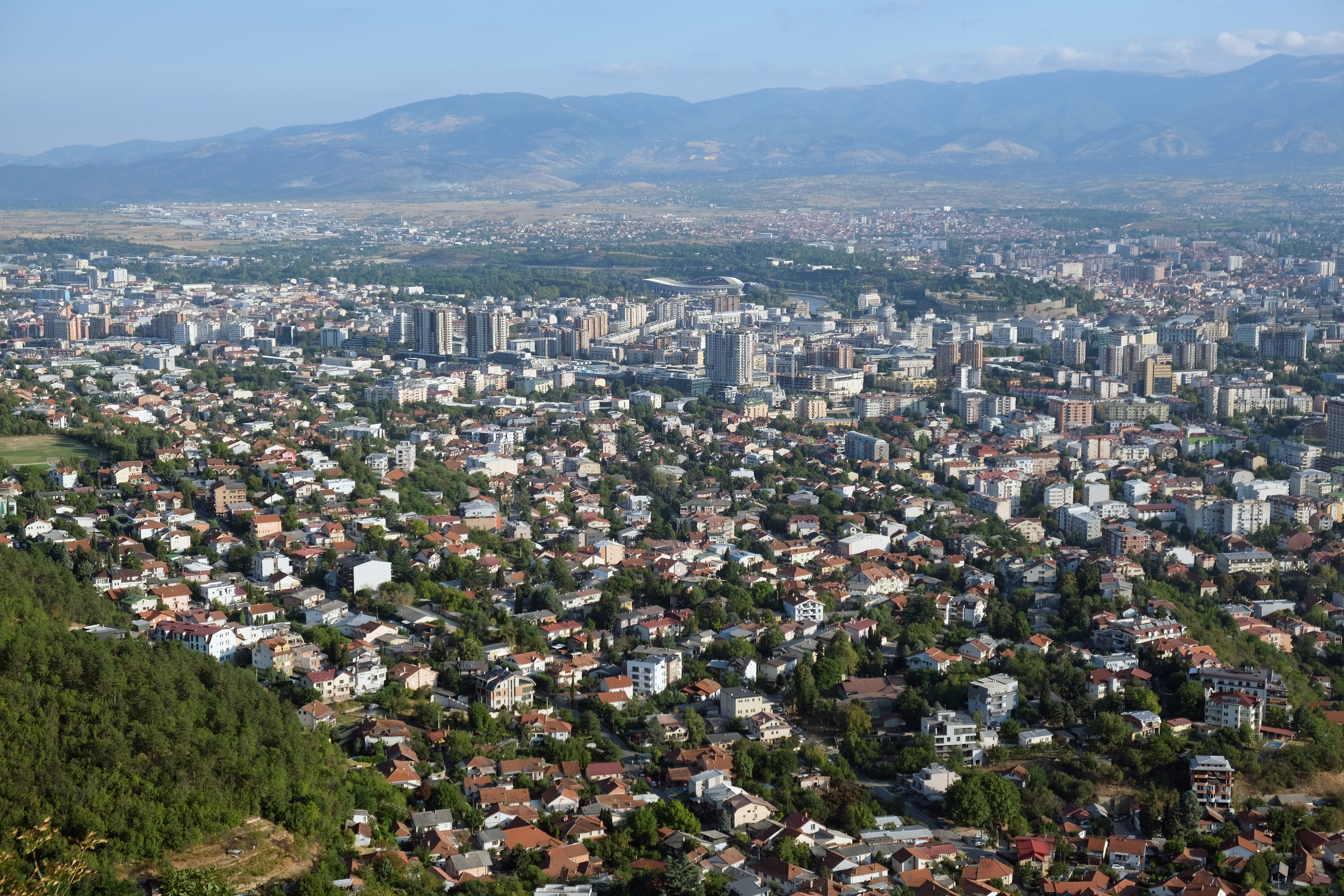
Skopje

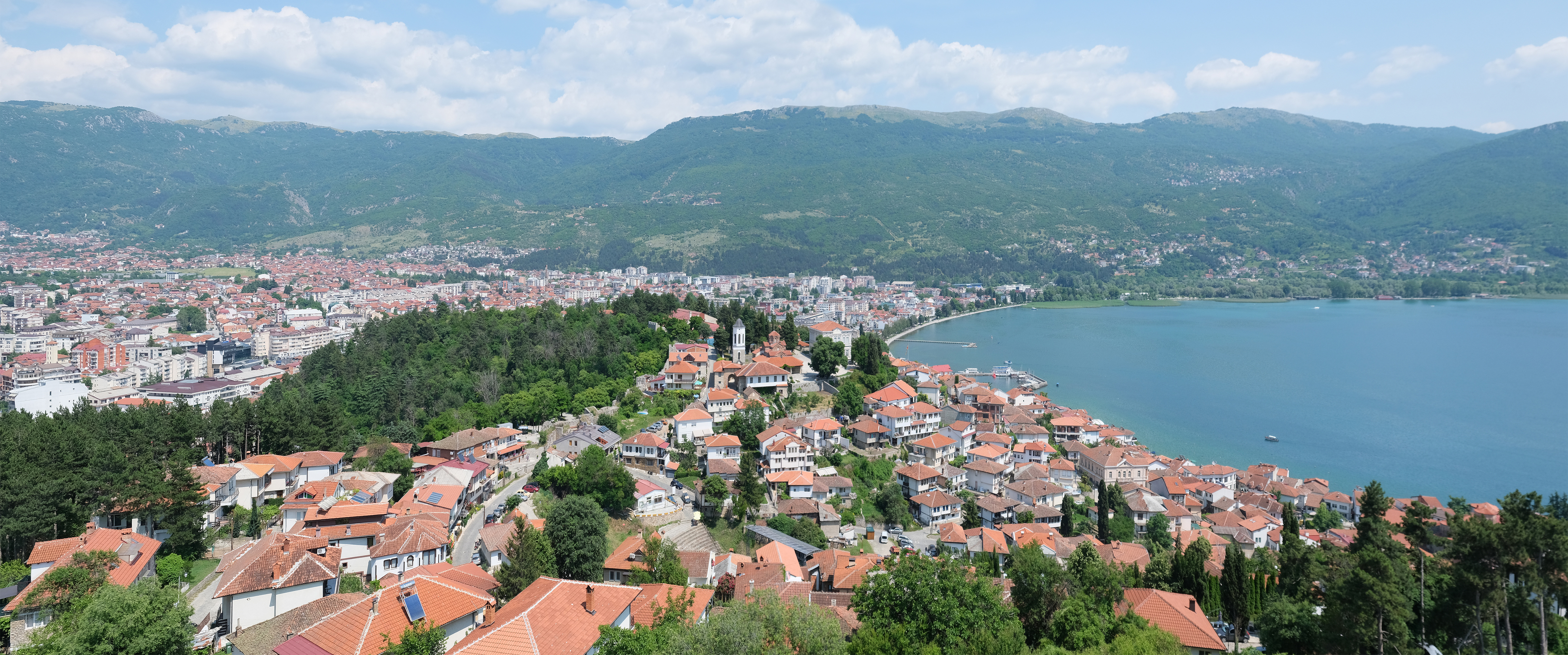
Ohrid

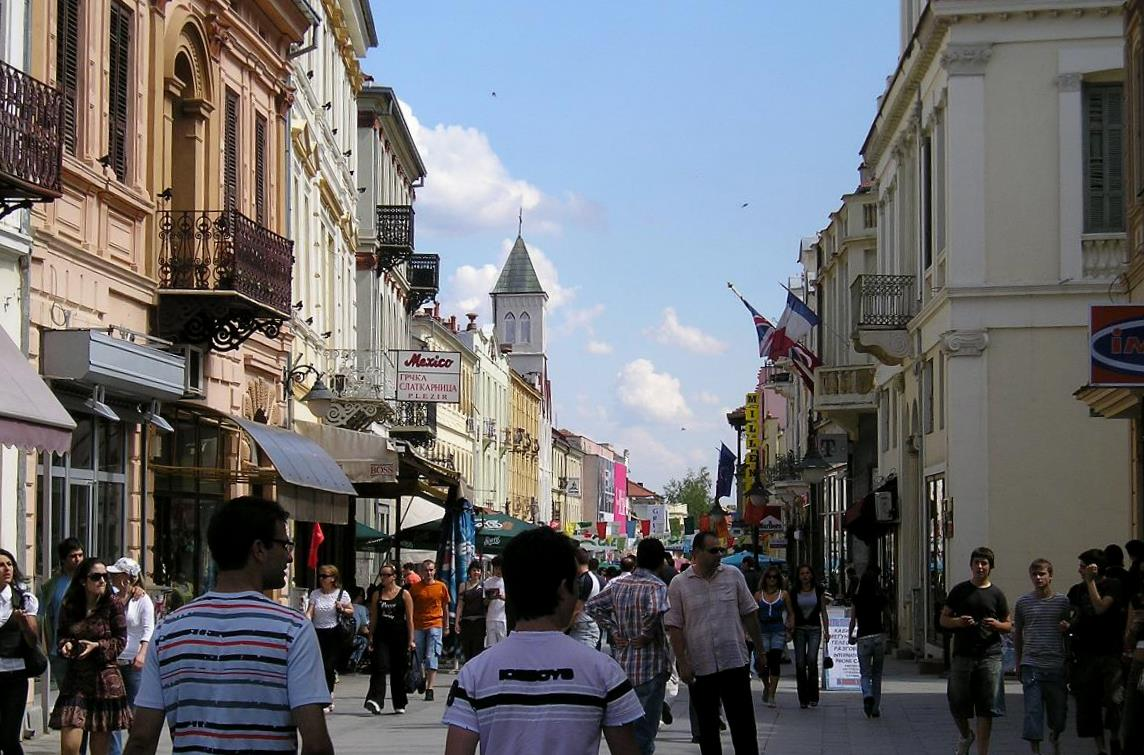
Bitola

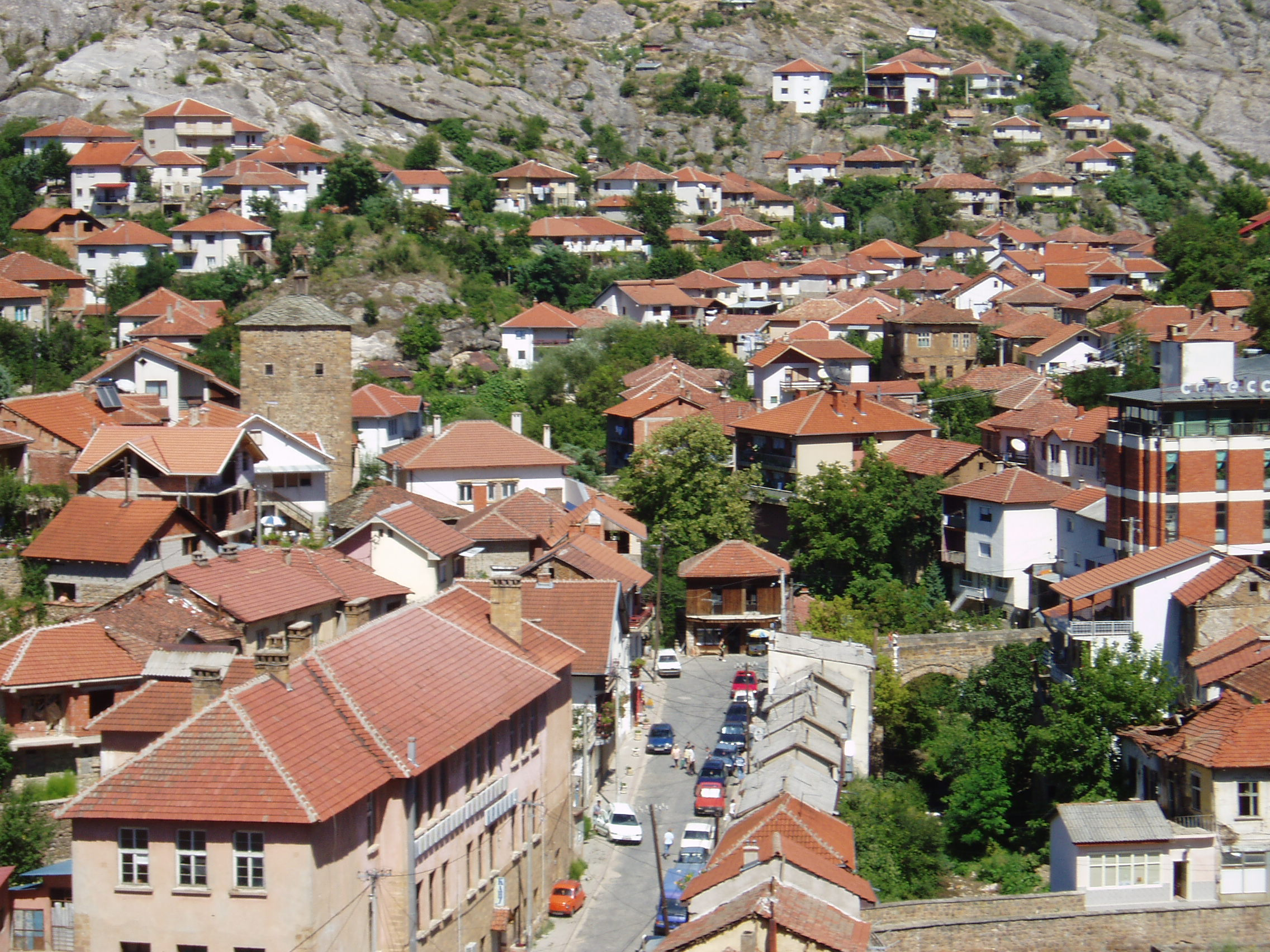
Kratovo

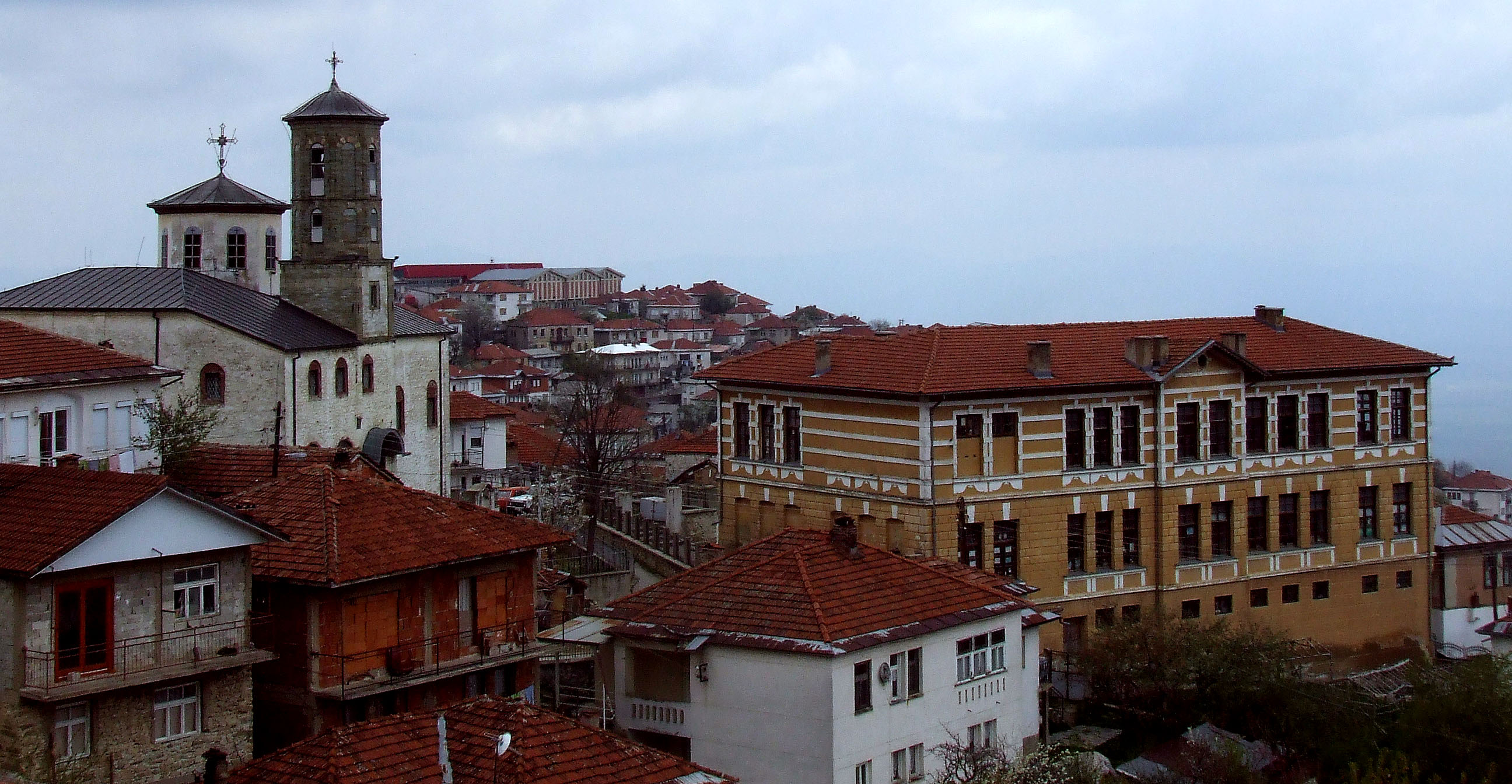
Kruševo

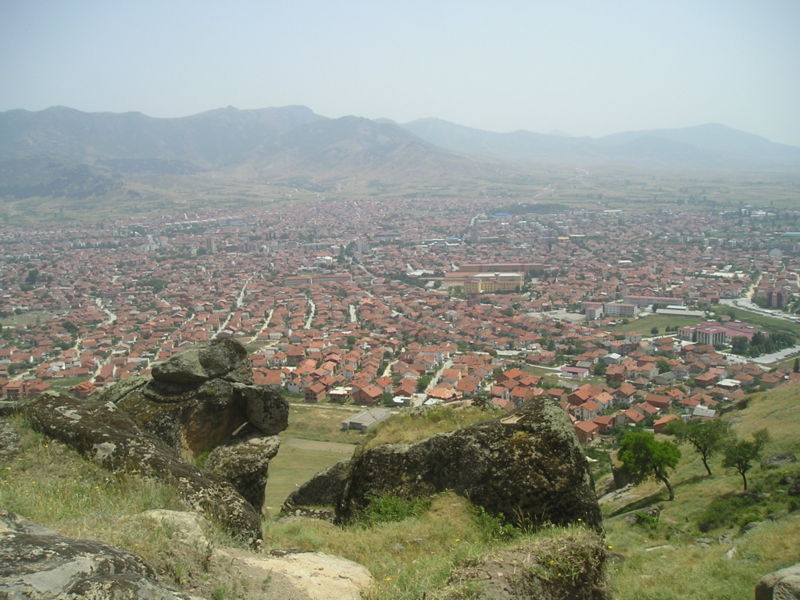
Prilep

Skopje, the capital and largest city, is situated in the northern part of the country on the Vardar River. Skopje has a long history that is evidenced by its many archaeological sites, such as Scupi and the Skopje Aqueduct, and the large number of Ottoman buildings and monuments, particularly in the Old Bazaar, such as Mustapha Pasha Mosque. Today, Skopje, with over 500,000 inhabitants, is becoming a modern city with museums and many cultural and sporting events.

Ohrid, a UNESCO World Heritage Site, is located in the southwestern part of the country on the eastern shore of Lake Ohrid. The town is perhaps the most popular tourist destination in the country, which is largely due to the beaches and atmosphere. However, Ohrid also has many historical monuments, such as Samuil's Fortress and the Antique Theatre, Church of St. Panteleimon, Church of St. Sophia, Church of St. John at Kaneo, Monastery of Saint Naum, Robevi family house & Plaošnik. There is also a number of beautiful fishing & mountain villages along the coastline which include Trpejca, Pestani, Elsani & Ljubanista.

Bitola, the country's second largest city with a population of about 100,000, is situated in the southern part of the country. Like many cities in the country, Bitola has also had a rich history. Heraclea Lyncestis, one of North Macedonia's largest archaeological sites, is located in Bitola. The long history of Bitola is also exemplified by the town's many neo-classical buildings, Ottoman buildings and monuments such as the Jeni Mosque, and old churches. The town is also a shopping destination; Širok Sokak, a pedestrian street, is filled with an endless number of stores and restaurants which go through to Magnolia Square. There is a small Ski resort about 12 km from the city centre situated on Baba Mountain which is also a great hiking mecca during the summer months between May & September.

Štip, the largest city east of the Vardar River, is located in the eastern part of the country. Štip has existed for at least 2,000 years which is showcased by its many archaeological sites, such as Astibo, Bargala, and Estipeon. The city is also home to the healing waters of the Kežovica Mineral Spa. Today, Štip is the main cultural and economical centre of eastern North Macedonia.

Kratovo is a small town in the eastern part of the country. It lies on the western slopes of Mount Osogovo at an altitude of 600 metres (2,000 ft) above sea level. Having a mild and pleasant climate, it is located in the crater of an extinct volcano. It is famous for its bridges and towers.

Kruševo is the highest town in North Macedonia, situated at an altitude of over 4,429 feet (1350 m) above sea level. It is home to Mečkin Kamen, a historical landmark which marks the spot of the uprising of 1903. On August 2 every year, it is the site of national Independence Day celebrations, which are attended by the President of North Macedonia and other political leaders. Kruševo is also home to Makedonium monument, dedicated to the Ilinden Uprising and the Kruševo Republic and many museums of the Ilinden Uprising. Because of its elevation, Kruševo is one of North Macedonia’s winter sports destinations. The famous Macedonian singer Tose Proeski is also buried here.

Prilep is known as "the city under Marko's Towers" because of its proximity to the towers of Prince Marko Markovi Kuli. The towers of medieval Prince Marko Mrnjavčević are located on a 120–180 m high hill, surrounded by steep slopes covered with minute granite stones. The upper part of the former settlement can be reached from its north and south side. The Treskavec monastery, built in the 12th century in the mountains about 10 km (6 mi) north of Prilep under Zlatovrv peak, at the edge of a small upland plain 1100 meters above sea level. Prilep has frescoes from the 14th and 15th centuries and is probably the site of the early Roman town of Kolobaise.

Other popular towns include Strumica, and Struga, which have many attractions of their own.

=== National parks and natural reserves ===
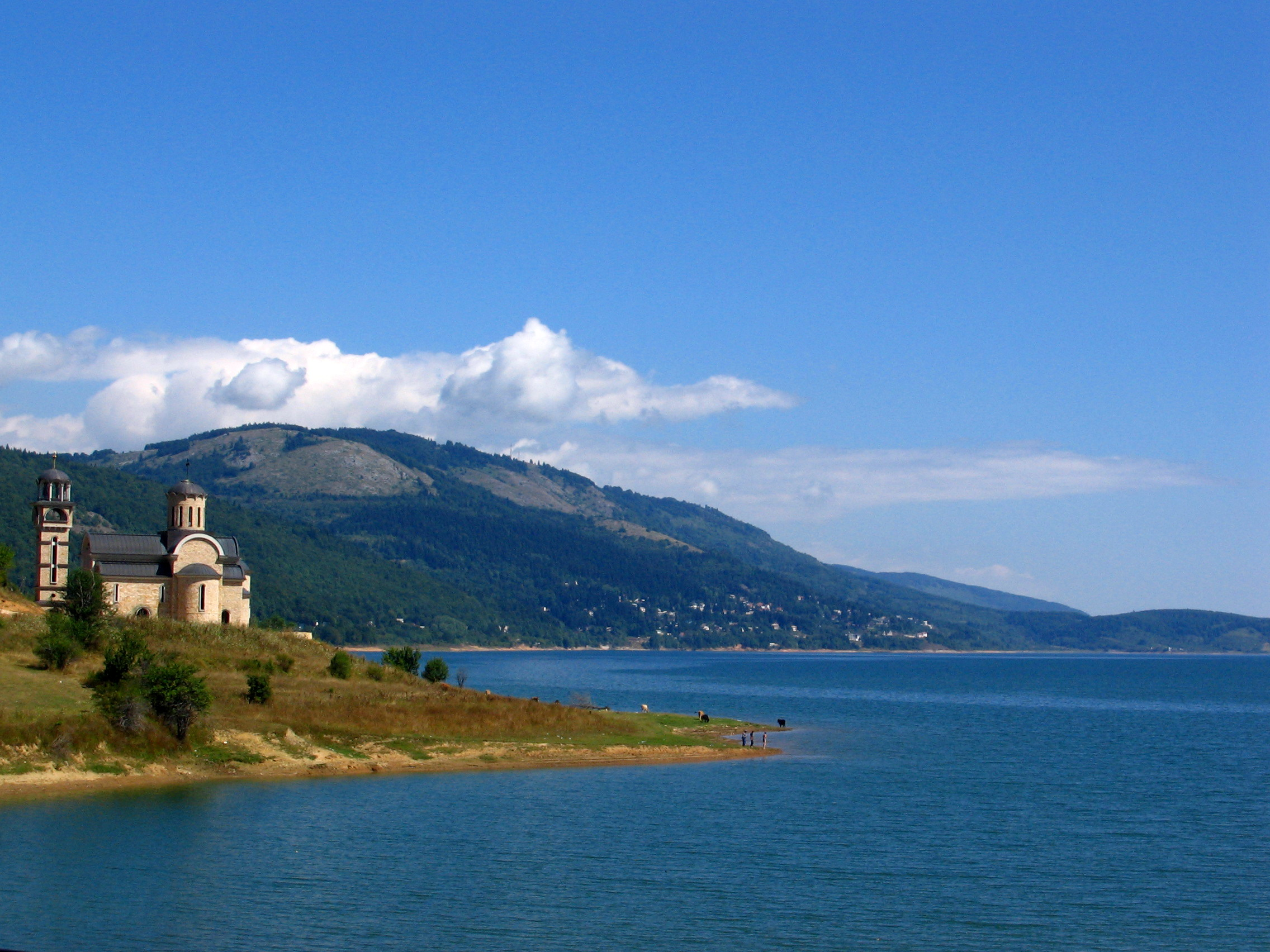
Mavrovo Lake

North Macedonia has three national parks and 33 natural reserves:

- Mavrovo, located in the northwestern part of the country, is the largest of the three national parks. It is home to several river valleys, gorges, waterfalls, caves, and other morphological formations.
- Pelister, located in the southern part of the country, near Bitola, is the smallest of the three national parks. The park consists of land that surrounds Baba Mountain. On top of the mountain are two glacial lakes, known as Gorski Oči, or mountain eyes.
- Galičica, located between Lake Ohrid and Lake Prespa, is the second largest national park in the country. The park is home to an abundance of diverse flora and fauna, and offers terrific views of Ohrid and Lake Ohrid.
- Ezereni Bird Sanctuary, located on the northern shore of Lake Prespa, is a strict natural reserve. It is home to over 120 different bird species.
- Tikveš Strict Natural Reserve, located 30 km southeast of Kavadarci, is a natural reserve that covers an area of approximately 100 square kilometres. 23 species of predatory birds are present in the reserve and 17 of these nest in the area. Tikveš is said to be one of the most important ornithological sites in Europe.
- Lokvi-Golemo Konjari Strict Natural Reserve, located near Kruševo, is a natural reserve that is the last remnant of a once enormous swamp.
- Mavrovo National Park, established in 1949, it is characterized by deep canyons, lakes, and dense forests that abound with diverse wildlife.

=== Other places ===
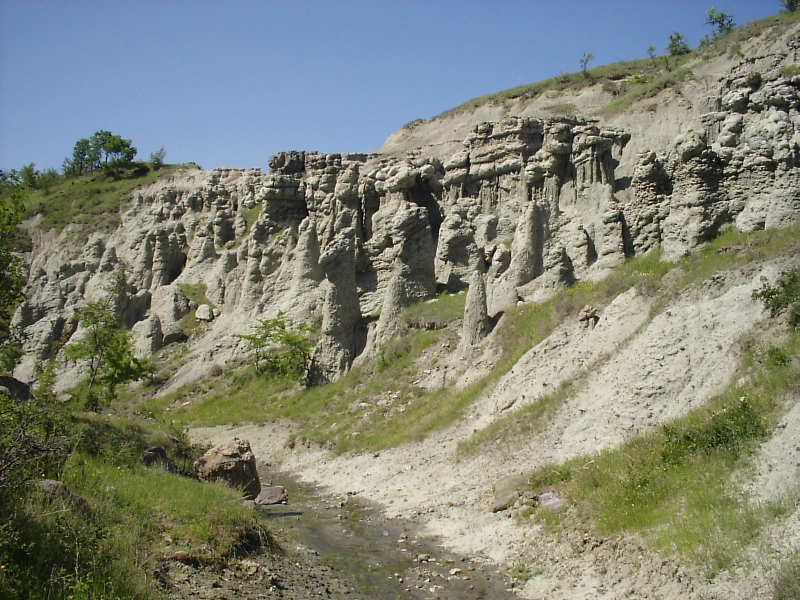
The stone town of Kuklica

- Stobi, situated in Gradsko, in the geographical center of the country, is the largest and considered to be the most famous archaeological site in North Macedonia. Some remains include basilicas, streets, thermae, living complexes, mosaics, and walls.
- Kokino, located 30 km from Kumanovo, is a megalithic observatory similar to Stonehenge. Being over 3,800 years old, it is the fourth oldest ancient observatory in the world.
- Marko's Tower, located just outside Prilep, is a rocky mass composed of several fine sculptures. It is on the list of possible UNESCO World Heritage Sites.
- Stone town of Kuklica, located outside Kratovo, is an area consisting of more than 120 naturally formed stone pillars that are over 10 million years old.

== Festivals ==
- Balkan Festival of Folk Songs and Dances, annual folklore music and dance festival
- Galičnik Wedding Festival, an annual festival held in Galičnik in which a selected couple gets married in the traditional "Galička" style wedding
- "Asterisks", an international children’s music festival
- Ohrid Swimming Marathon, an international open water swimming competition in Lake Ohrid

== Gallery ==
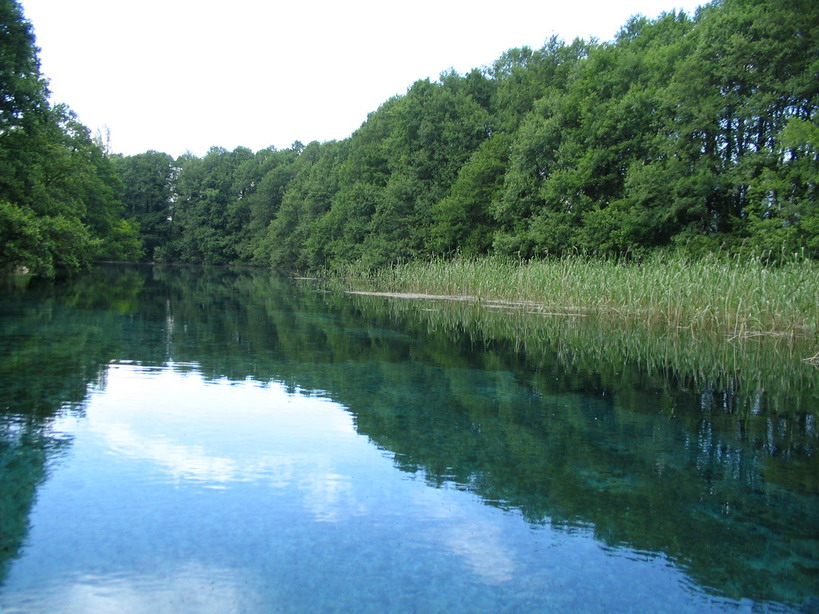
Black Drin River

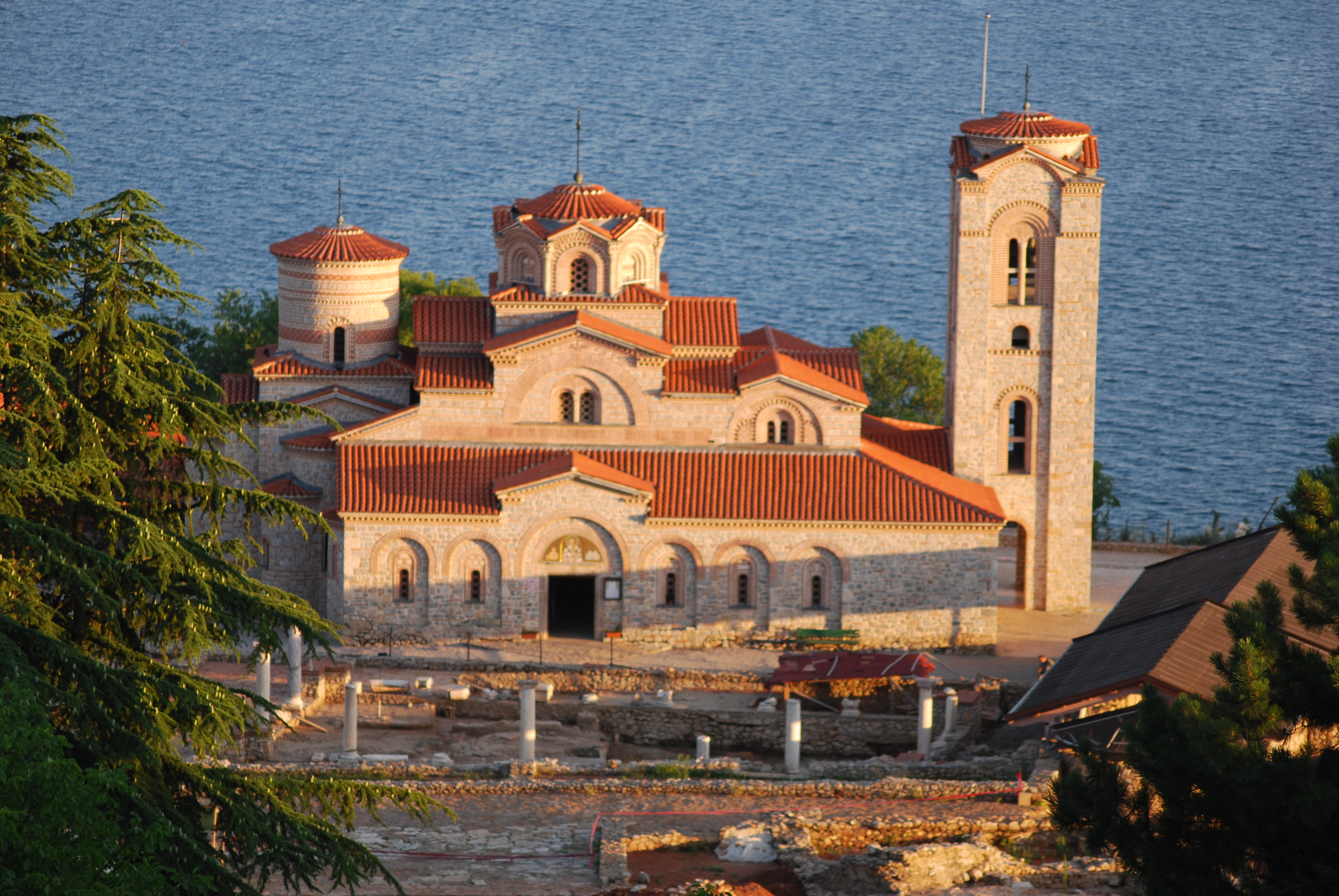
St. Panteleimon at Plaošnik

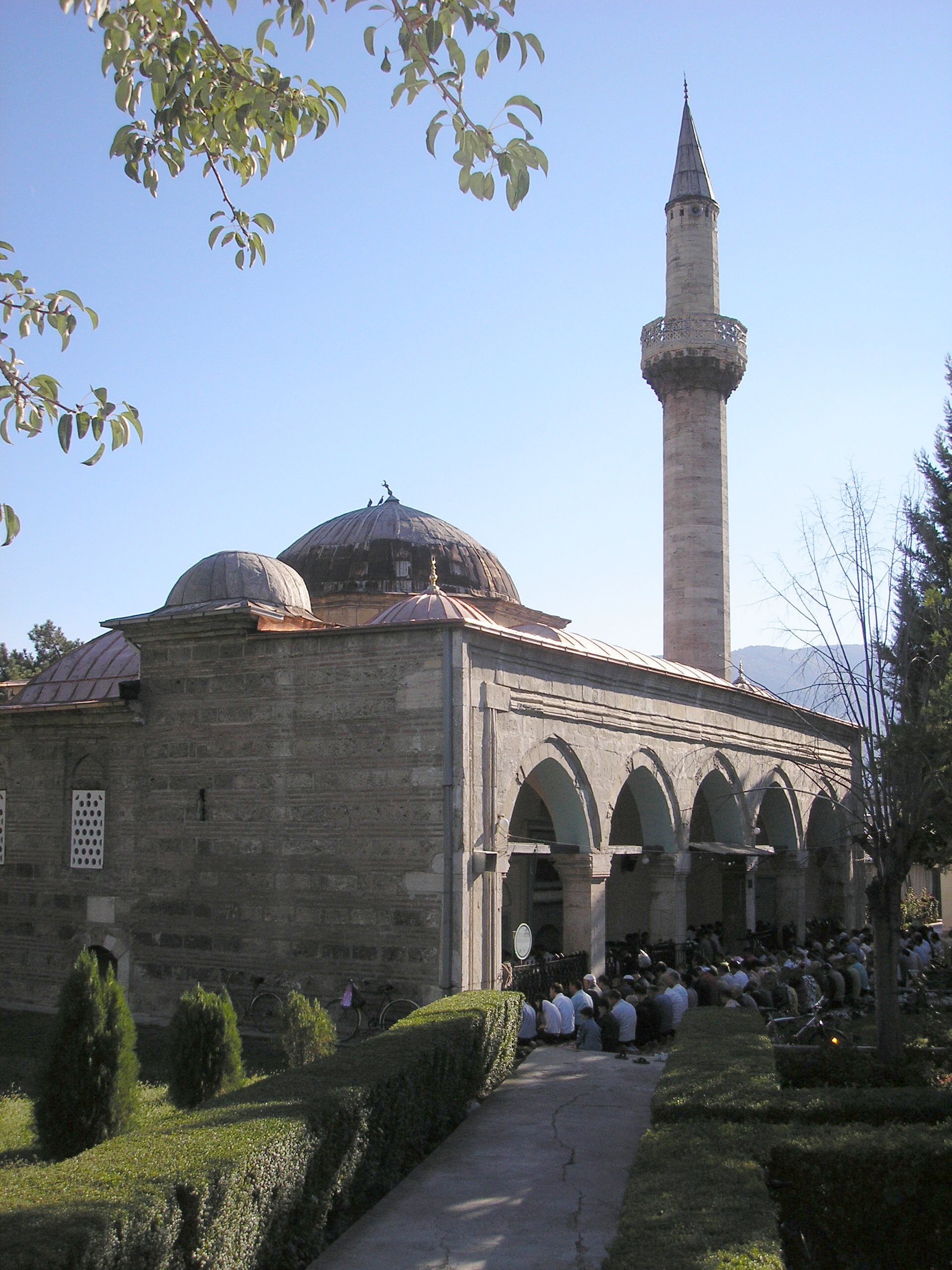
Ishak Beg Mosque in Skopje

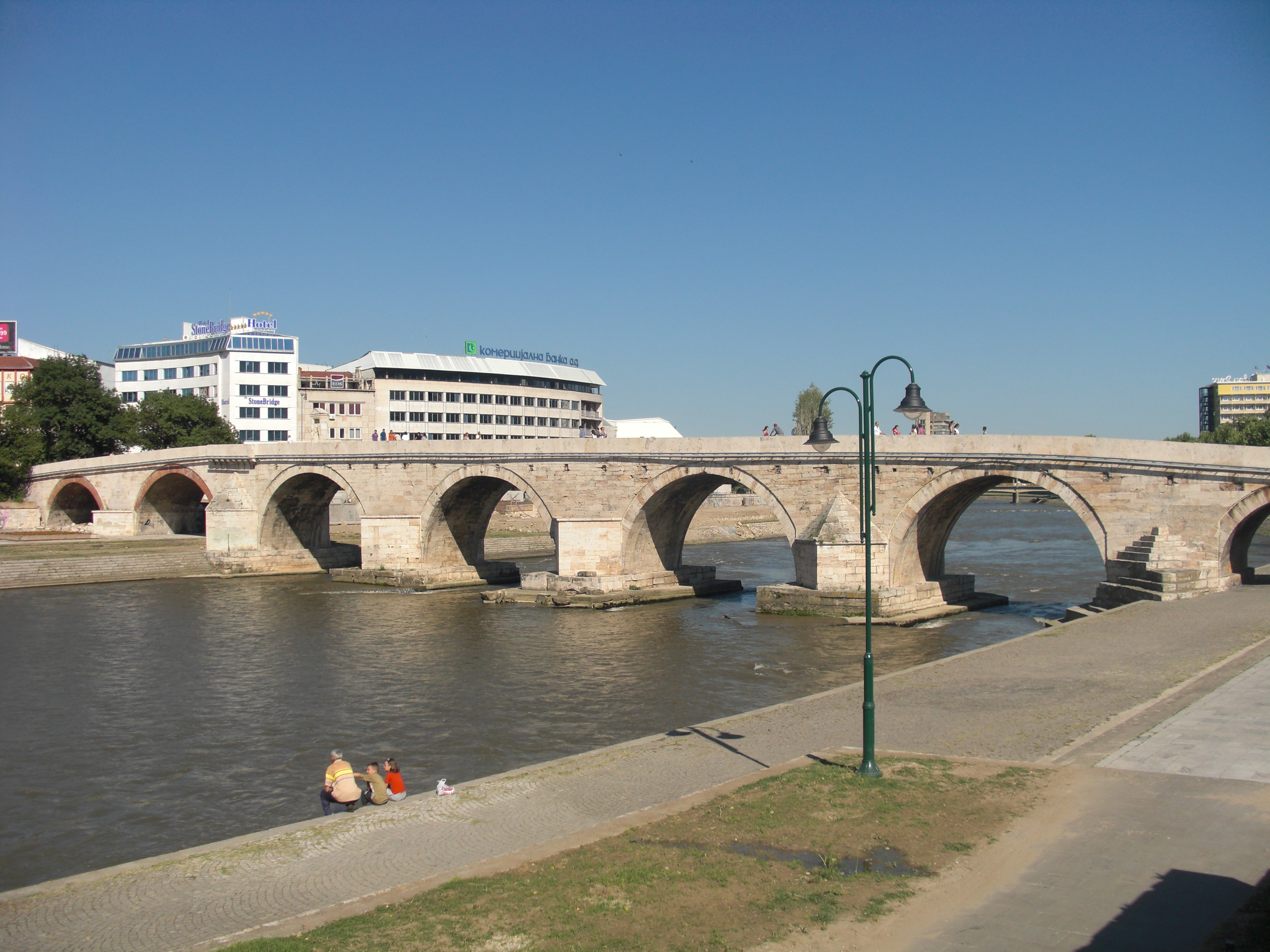
Stone Bridge of Skopje

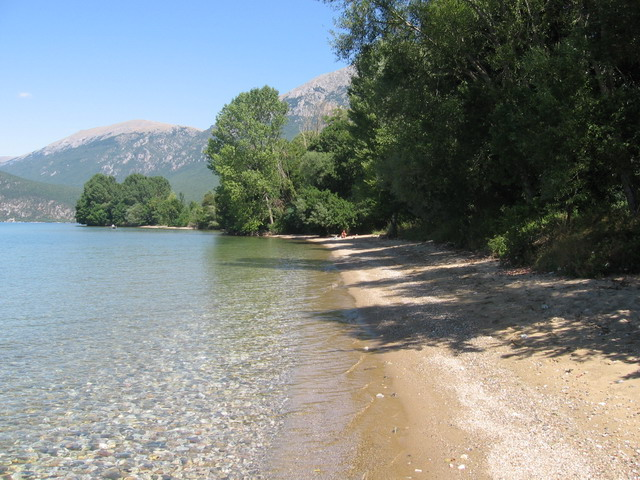
Beach near Ohrid

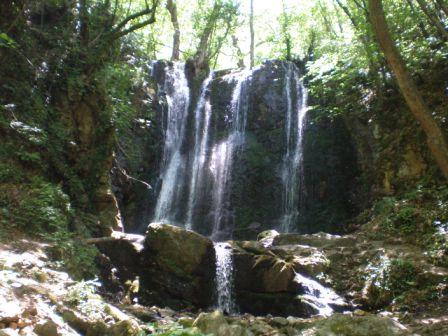
Waterfall in Kolešino near Strumica

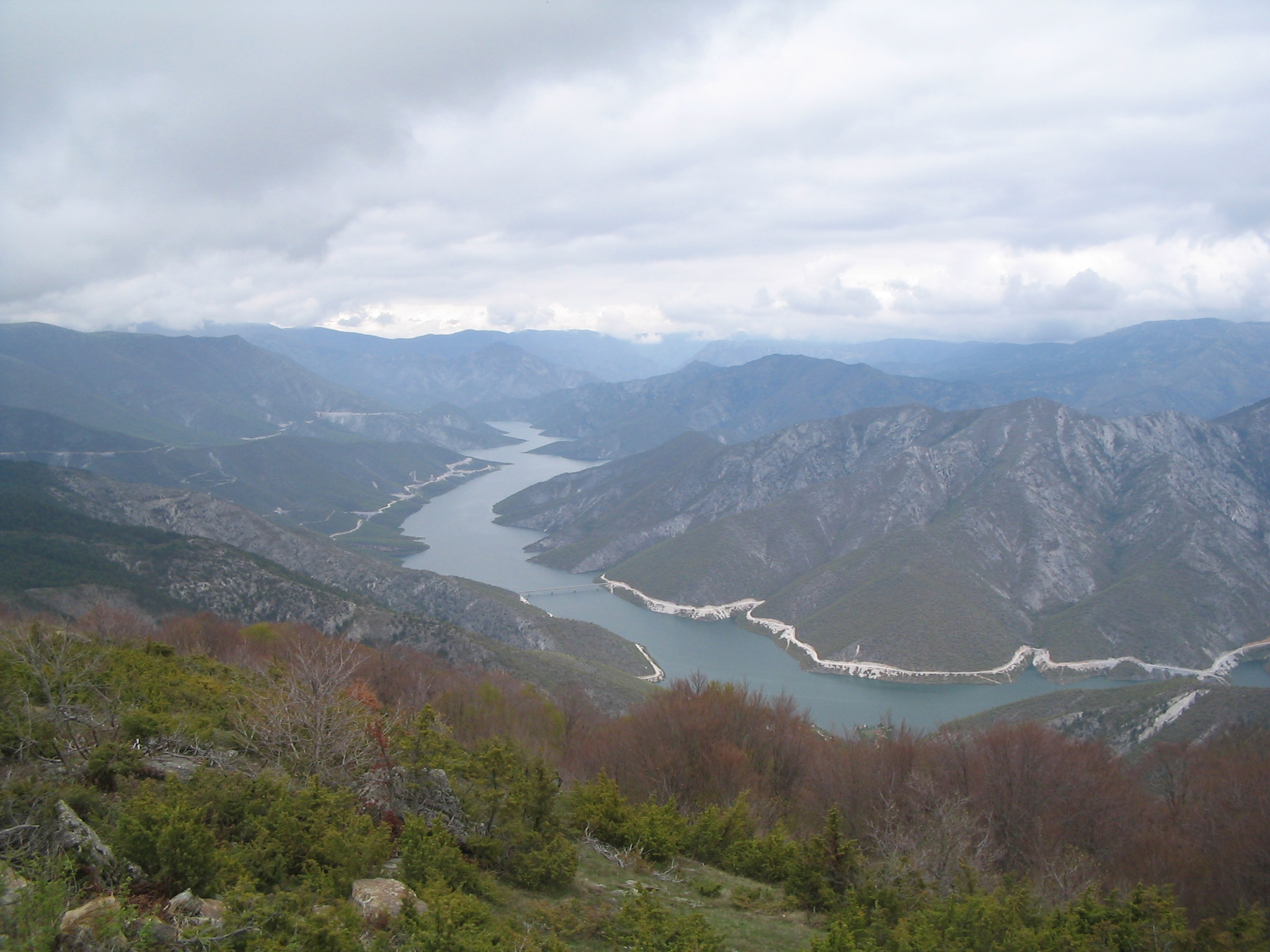
Kozjak Hydro Power Plant, Poreče

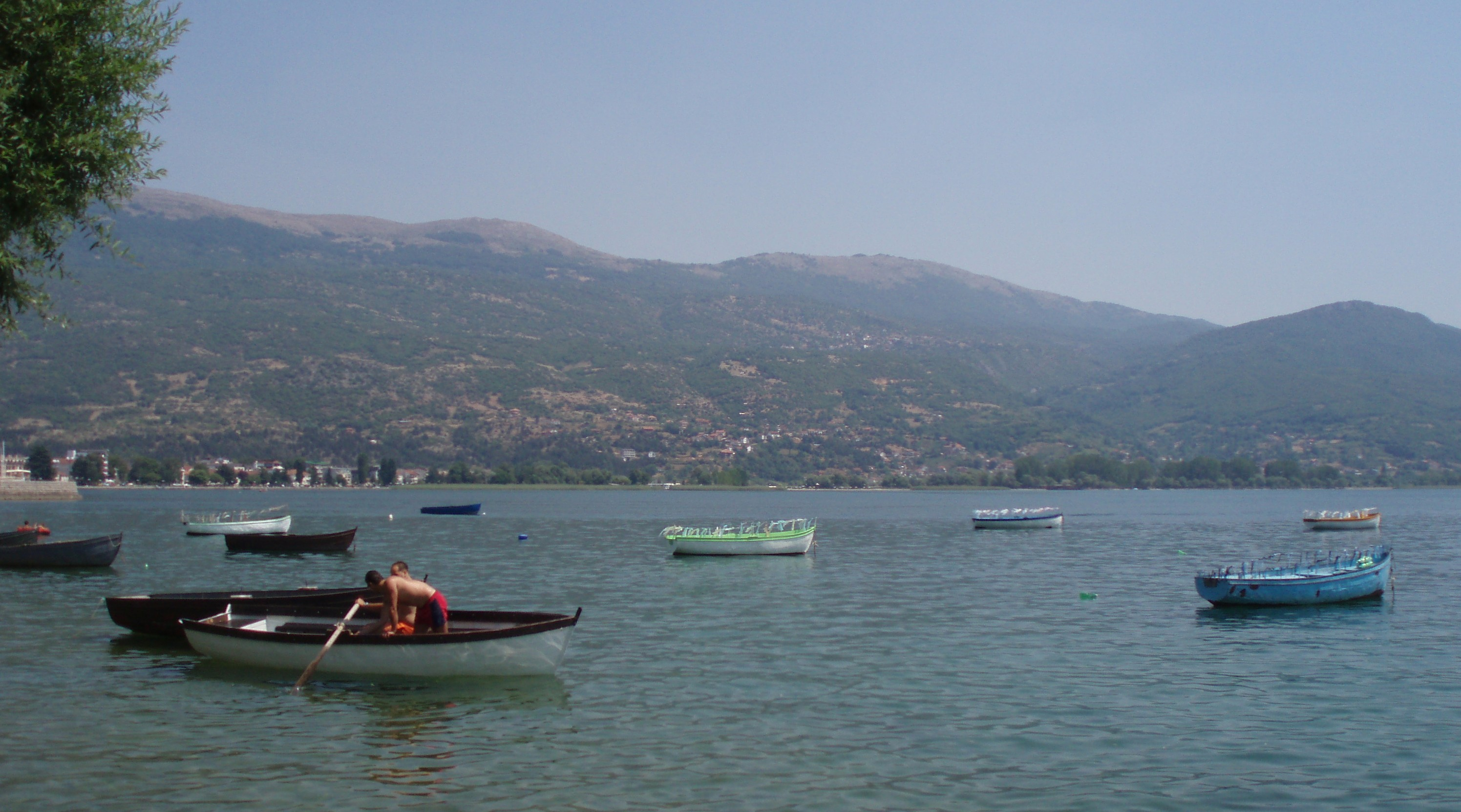
Lake Ohrid

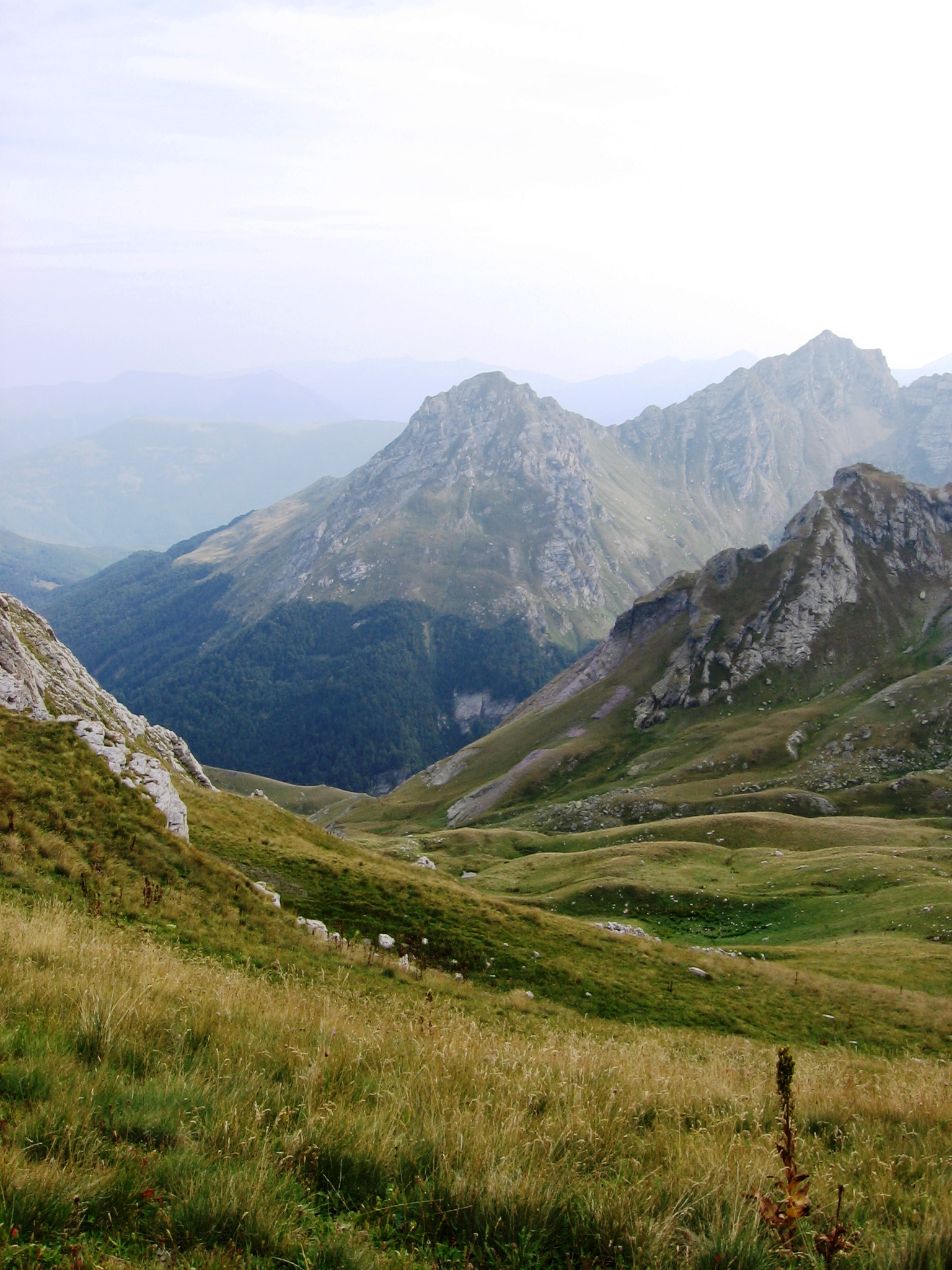
Mount Korab

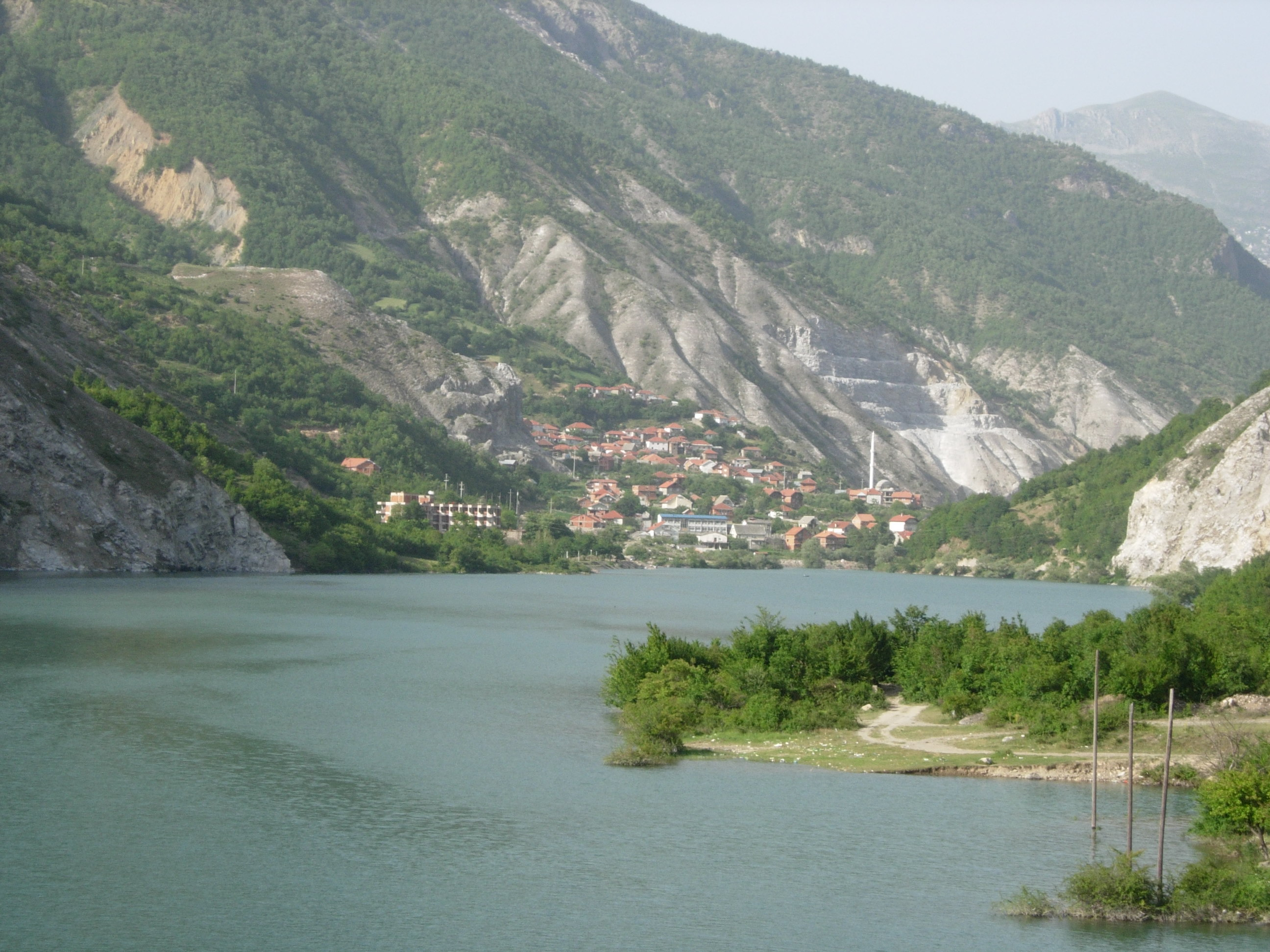
Radika River

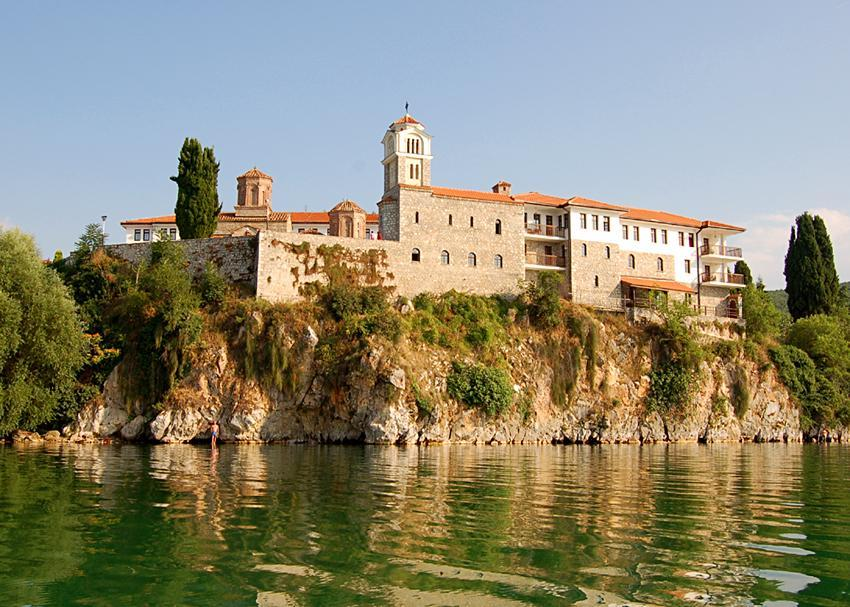
Monastery of Saint Naum over Lake Ohrid

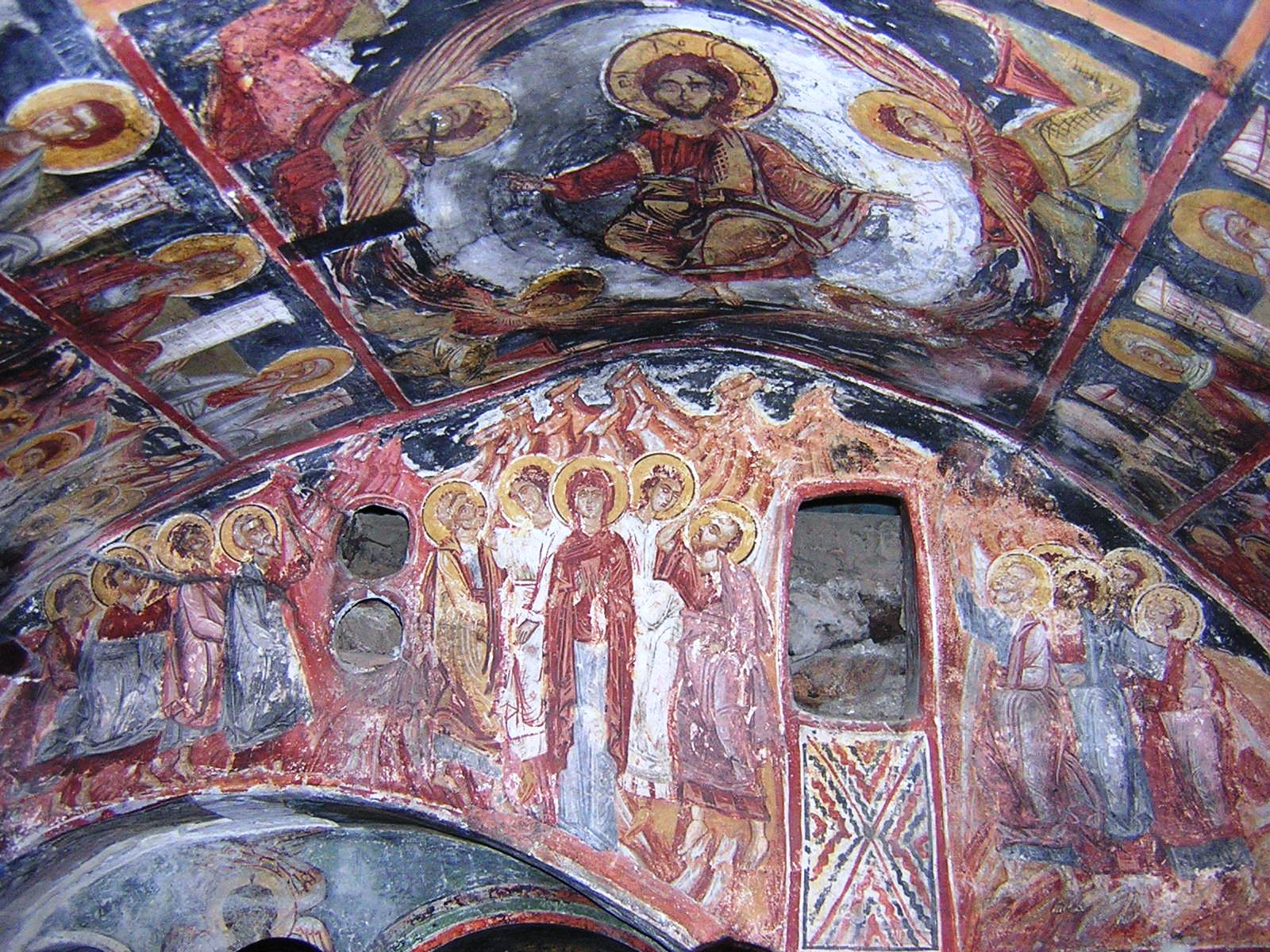
Ancient frescoes at the Kališta monastery in Struga

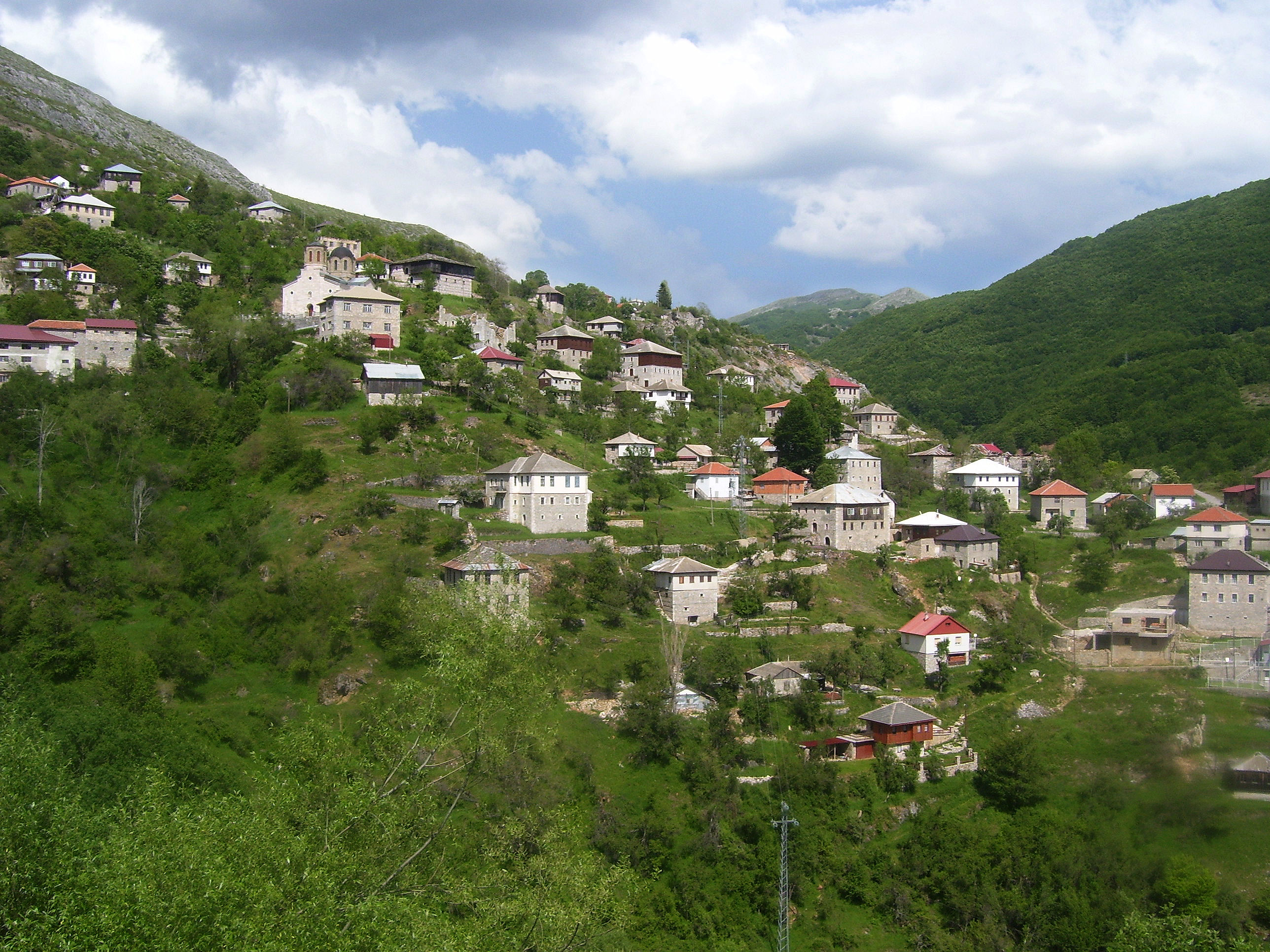
Galičnik

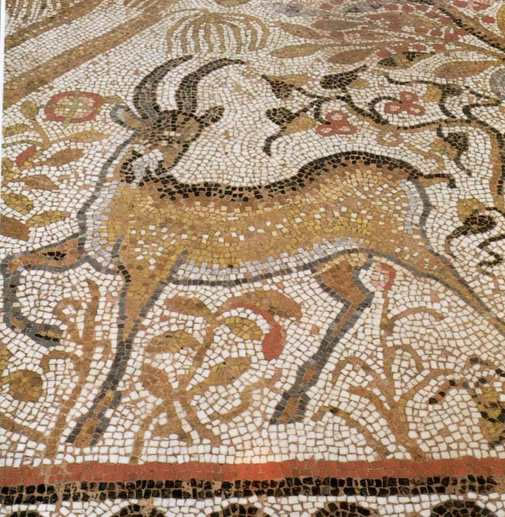
Mosaic at Heraclea Lyncestis

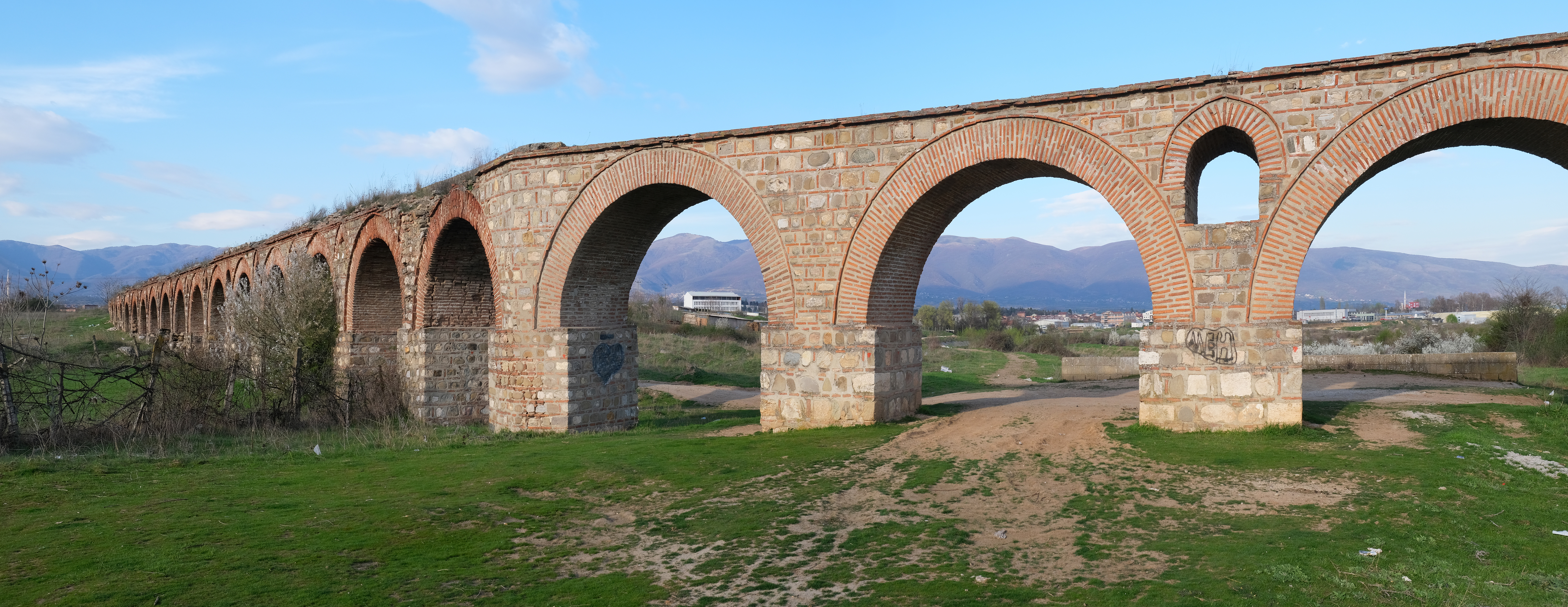
Skopje Aqueduct

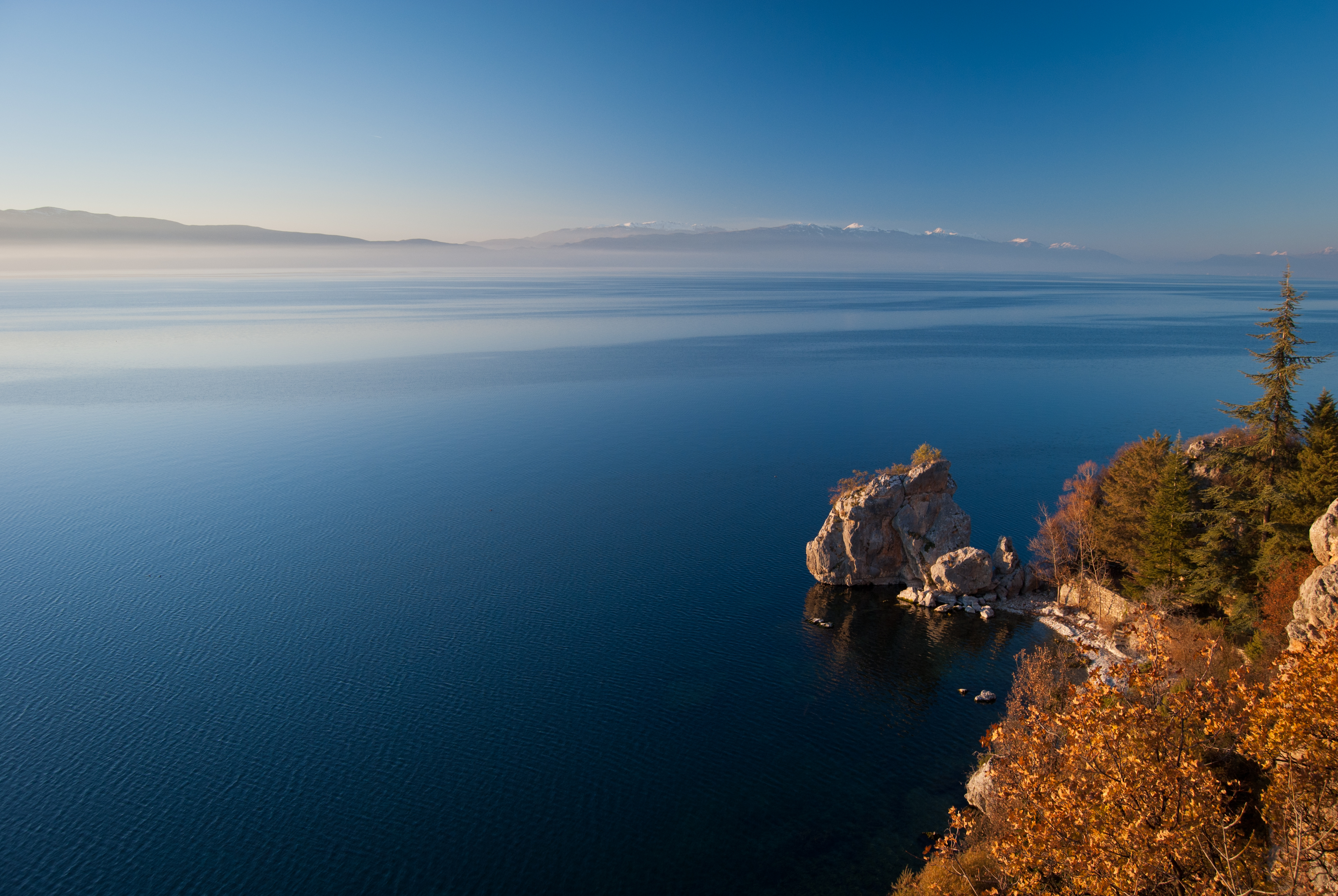
Lake Ohrid

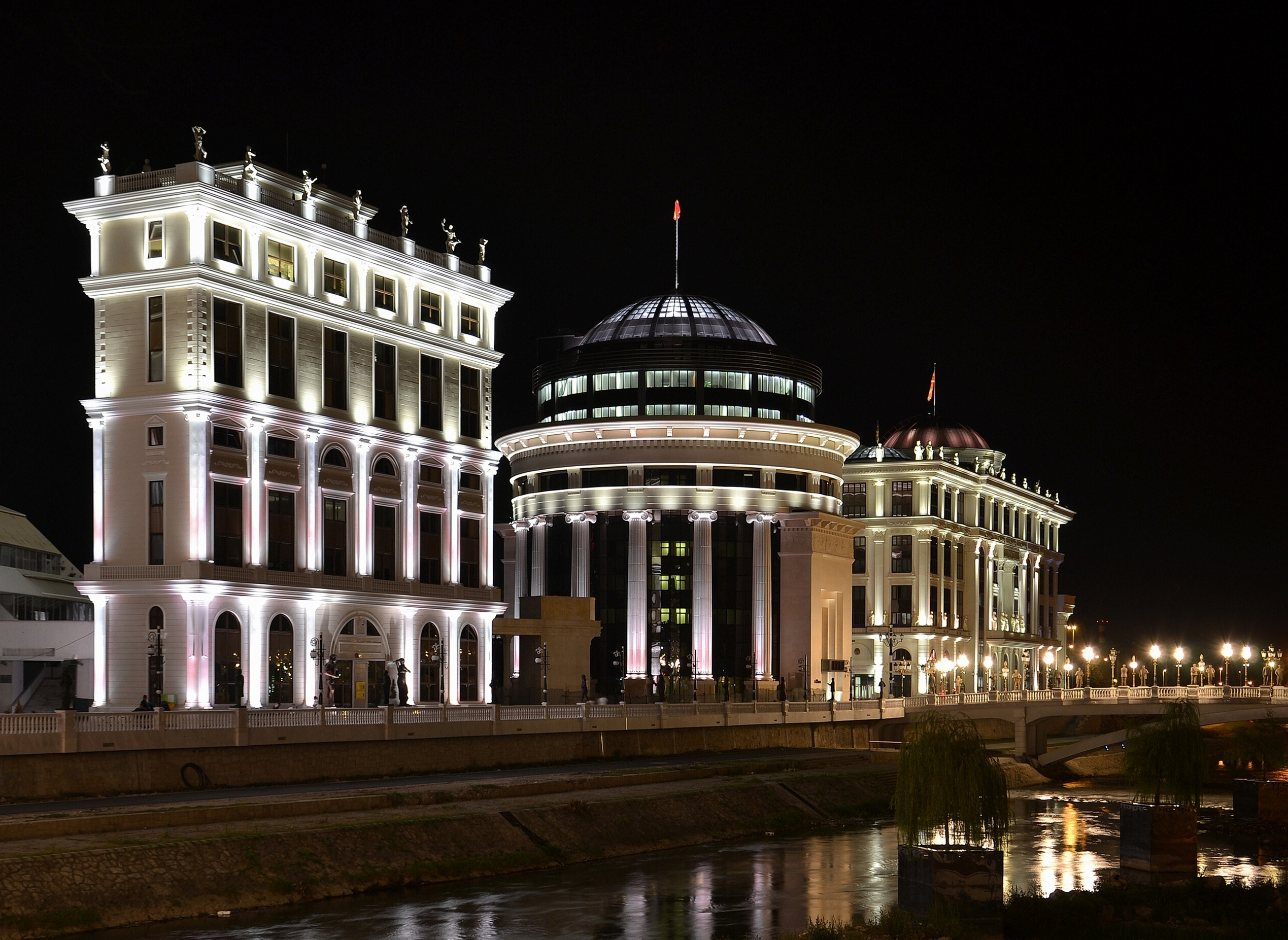
Skopje

== See also ==
- Visa policy of North Macedonia
