= Visa requirements for citizens of North Macedonia =

Administrative entry restrictions

North Macedonian passport

Visa requirements for citizens of North Macedonia are administrative entry restrictions by the authorities of other states placed on citizens of North Macedonia.

As of 2026, citizens of North Macedonia had visa-free or visa on arrival access to 126 countries and territories, ranking the North Macedonian passport 37th in the world, according to the Henley Passport Index.

== Visa requirements map ==
Visa requirements for citizens of North Macedonia holding ordinary passports North Macedonia ID card travel Visa not required Visa on arrival eVisa Visa available both on arrival or online Visa-free with voucher or letter of invitation Visa required

== Visa requirements ==
| Country | Visa requirement | Allowed stay | Notes (excluding departure fees) | Reciprocity |
|---|---|---|---|---|
| Afghanistan | eVisa | 30 days | Visa is not required in case born in Afghanistan or can proof that one of their parents is a national of Afghanistan or born in Afghanistan.; e-Visa : Visitors must arrive at Kabul International (KBL). | X |
| Albania | Visa not required | 90 days | ID card valid.; 90 days within any 180 day period. | ✓ |
| Algeria | Visa required | | | ✓ |
| Andorra | Visa not required | | | ✓ |
| Angola | Visa required | | | ✓ |
| Antigua and Barbuda | eVisa | | Negotiations to abolish visa requirements are currently in progress; Permanent residents of the United States and Canada and holders of valid visas of the United States, Canada, Schengen Area and the United Kingdom do not require a visa. | X |
| Argentina | Visa not required | 90 days | | ✓ |
| Armenia | eVisa / Visa on arrival | 120 days | | X |
| Australia | Online Visa required | | Online Visitor e600 visa. | X |
| Austria | Visa not required | 90 days | 90 days within any 180 day period in the Schengen Area. (Note: Holders of biometric passports only.) | ✓ |
| Azerbaijan | eVisa | 30 days | | X |
| Bahamas | Visa not required | 3 months | | ✓ |
| Bahrain | eVisa | 14 days | | ✓ |
| Bangladesh | Visa on arrival | 30 days | Not available at all entry points. | X |
| Barbados | Visa not required | 90 days | | X |
| Belarus | Visa not required | 30 days | Visa-free until 31 December 2024. | ✓ |
| Belgium | Visa not required | 90 days | 90 days within any 180 day period in the Schengen Area. | ✓ |
| Belize | Visa required | | Visa not required for A max. stay of 90 days for holders of a valid visa issued by a Schengen Member.; Holders of a valid multiple entry visa issued by the USA can obtain a visa on arrival. | ✓ |
| Benin | eVisa | 30 days | Must have an international vaccination certificate. | X |
| Bhutan | eVisa | | Pre-approved visa can be picked up on arrival. | ✓ |
| Bolivia | Online Visa / Visa on arrival | 30 days | | X |
| Bosnia and Herzegovina | Visa not required | 90 days | 90 days within any 6-month period.; ID card valid. | ✓ |
| Botswana | eVisa | 3 months | | X |
| Brazil | Visa not required | 90 days | 90 days within any 180 day period. | ✓ |
| Brunei | Visa required | | | X |
| Bulgaria | Visa not required | 90 days | 90 days within any 180 day period in the Schengen Area. | ✓ |
| Burkina Faso | eVisa | | | ✓ |
| Burundi | Visa on arrival | 1 month | | ✓ |
| Cambodia | eVisa / Visa on arrival | 30 days | | X |
| Cameroon | eVisa | | Pre-approved visa can be picked up on arrival. | ✓ |
| Canada | Visa required | | Visa not required for permanent residents of the United States. | X |
| Cape Verde | Visa on arrival | | Not available at all entry points. | X |
| Central African Republic | Visa required | | | ✓ |
| Chad | eVisa | | | ✓ |
| Chile | Visa not required | 90 days | | ✓ |
| China | Visa not required | 30 days | Visa-free from 30 November, 2024 to 31 December, 2026.; 240-hour (10-day) visa-free transit to a third country or region (including Hong Kong, Macau or Taiwan) using any mode of transport. Must have a confirmed onward ticket/itinerary, and enter through 1 of 64 approved ports.; During which, may freely travel within the 24 provinces permitted for visa-free transit and engage in tourism, business, and visits.; 24-hour visa-free transit to a third country or region (including Hong Kong, Macau, and Taiwan), is available at most international airports, without leaving the airport.; Travellers who need to leave the airport may obtain a temporary entry permit from immigration.; 5-day port visa (Visa on Arrival) for Shenzhen if arriving at designated ports of entry from Hong Kong by land or sea, for stays within Shenzhen.; 3-day port visa (Visa on Arrival) if arriving in Zhuhai or Xiamen at designated ports of entry, for stays within the respective city.; 15-day visa-free entry for cruise ship passengers in tour groups, if arriving at any cruise port along China's coastline, including but not limited to Tianjin; Dalian; Shanghai; Lianyungang; Wenzhou; Zhoushan; Xiamen; Qingdao; Guangzhou; Shenzhen; Beihai; Haikou; Sanya. May further travel inland to all regions of coastal provinces (and equivalents) and Beijing.; May apply for a port visa (Visa on Arrival) if travelling for an urgent, qualified reason. Prior clearance for port visa is highly recommended or may be denied boarding by airlines.; Visa not required for holders of normal North Macedonia passports endorsed "on business". | ✔️ |
| Colombia | Visa not required | | | ✓ |
| Comoros | Visa on arrival | 45 days | | X |
| Republic of the Congo | eVisa | | | ✓ |
| Democratic Republic of the Congo | eVisa | 7 days | | ✓ |
| Costa Rica | Visa required | | Visa not required for holders of a visa issued by the USA (except for B1, B2, C1 and D visas), provided valid for at least 6 months from date of arrival.; Additionally a max. stay of 30 days is allowed for residents of Canada or an EU Member provided the residence is valid for at least 6 months on arrival. | X |
| Côte d'Ivoire | eVisa | 3 months | e-Visa holders must arrive via Port Bouet Airport. | X |
| Croatia | Visa not required | 90 days | 90 days within any 180 day period. | ✓ |
| Cuba | Visa required | | | ✓ |
| Cyprus | Visa not required | 90 days | 90 days within any 180 day period in the Schengen Area. | ✓ |
| Czech Republic | Visa not required | 90 days | 90 days within any 180 day period in the Schengen Area. | ✓ |
| Denmark | Visa not required | 90 days | 90 days within any 180 day period in the Schengen Area. | ✓ |
| Djibouti | eVisa | 90 days | | X |
| Dominica | Visa not required | 21 days | | X |
| Dominican Republic | Visa not required | 90 days | | X |
| Ecuador | Visa not required | 90 days | | X |
| Egypt | eVisa / Visa on arrival | 30 days | | X |
| El Salvador | Visa not required | 180 days | | ✓ |
| Equatorial Guinea | eVisa | | | ✓ |
| Eritrea | Visa required | | Pre-approved visa can be picked up on arrival. | ✓ |
| Estonia | Visa not required | 90 days | 90 days within any 180 day period in the Schengen Area. | ✓ |
| Eswatini | Visa required | | | X |
| Ethiopia | eVisa / Visa on arrival | up to 90 days | e-Visa holders must arrive via Addis Ababa Bole International Airport | X |
| Fiji | eVisa | | | ✓ |
| Finland | Visa not required | 90 days | 90 days within any 180 day period in the Schengen Area. | ✓ |
| France | Visa not required | 90 days | 90 days within any 180 day period in the Schengen Area. | ✓ |
| Gabon | eVisa | 90 days | e-Visa holders must arrive via Libreville International Airport. | X |
| Gambia | Visa required | | | X |
| Georgia | Visa not required | 90 days | | ✓ |
| Germany | Visa not required | 90 days | 90 days within any 180 day period in the Schengen Area. | ✓ |
| Ghana | Visa required | | | ✓ |
| Greece | Visa not required | 90 days | 90 days within any 180 day period in the Schengen Area. | ✓ |
| Grenada | Visa on arrival | 3 months | | X |
| Guatemala | Visa not required | 90 days | | ✓ |
| Guinea | eVisa | 90 days | | X |
| Guinea-Bissau | Visa on arrival | 90 days | | X |
| Guyana | Visa required | | | ✓ |
| Haiti | Visa not required | 90 days | | X |
| Honduras | Visa not required | 90 days | | ✓ |
| Hungary | Visa not required | 90 days | 90 days within any 180 day period in the Schengen Area. | ✓ |
| Iceland | Visa not required | 90 days | 90 days within any 180 day period in the Schengen Area. | ✓ |
| India | eVisa | 60 days | e-Visa holders must arrive via 32 designated airports (Note: Ahmedabad; Amritsar; Bagdogra; Bengaluru; Bhubaneswar; Chandigarh; Chennai; Coimbatore; Delhi; Gaya; Goa-Dabolim; Goa-Manohar; Guwahati; Hyderabad; Indore; Jaipur; Kannur; Kochi; Kolkata; Kozhikode; Lucknow; Madurai; Mangaluru; Mumbai; Nagpur; Port Blair; Pune; Surat; Thiruvananthapuram; Tiruchirappalli; Varanasi; Visakhapatnam) or 5 designated seaports. (Note: Chennai; Cochin; Mormugao (Goa); Mumbai; Mangalore); An Indian e-Tourist Visa may only be obtained twice within 1 calendar year.; Foreigners of Pakistani origin or who hold a Pakistani Passport are not eligible for an e-Visa. Foreigners who are not Pakistani nationals, but whose parents or grandparents (either paternal or maternal) were born in, or were permanent residents in Pakistan, are also not eligible for an e-Visa. | X |
| Indonesia | eVisa | 60 days | | X |
| Iran | eVisa | 30 days | | X |
| Iraq | eVisa | | | X |
| Ireland | Visa required | | Visa is issued free of charge.; Visa waiver for UK 'C' visa holders. Entry permitted only if first point of entry to the Common Travel Area is in the UK. | X |
| Israel | ETA-IL | 90 days | | ✓ |
| Italy | Visa not required | 90 days | 90 days within any 180 day period in the Schengen Area. | ✓ |
| Jamaica | Visa on arrival | 30 days | | X |
| Japan | Visa not required | 90 days | | ✓ |
| Jordan | eVisa / Visa on arrival | 30 days | Visa can be obtained upon arrival, it will cost a total of 40 JOD, obtainable at most international ports of entry and land border crossings. (except King Hussein/Allenby Bridge) | X |
| Kazakhstan | eVisa | | | X |
| Kenya | Electronic Travel Authorisation | 90 days | Applications can be submitted up to 90 days prior to travel and must be submitted at least 3 days in advance.; eTA fee is 32.50 USD.; Proof of reservation at the hotel where visitors plan to stay is required (if staying with friends, an invitation letter is also acceptable).; Yellow fever vaccination certificate is required if coming from endemic countries. | X |
| Kiribati | Visa required | | | ✓ |
| North Korea | Visa required | | | ✓ |
| South Korea | Visa required | | | X |
| Kuwait | Visa required | | | ✓ |
| Kyrgyzstan | Visa not required | 60 days | Visa on arrival available at Manas International Airport.; e-Visa holders must arrive via Manas International Airport or Osh Airport or through land crossings with China (at Irkeshtam and Torugart), Kazakhstan (at Ak-jol, Ak-Tilek, Chaldybar, Chon-Kapka), Tajikistan (at Bor-Dobo, Kulundu, Kyzyl-Bel) and Uzbekistan (at Dostuk). | X |
| Laos | eVisa / Visa on arrival | 30 days | 18 (Note: Savannakhet Airport; Lanetoui - Mengkang (China); Meuangmom - Wan Pong (Myanmar); Banvang - Ban Khok Phai (Thailand); Namngeun - Huay Kon (Thailand); Paksan - Bueng Kan (Thailand); Paktaphan - Pak Saeng (Thailand); Pangmon - Ban Huak (Thailand); Phoudou (Thailand); Dak ta ock - Nam Giang (Vietnam); La Lai (Vietnam); Namkan (Vietnam); Namphao - Cau Treo (Vietnam); Namsoy - Na Meo (Vietnam); Naphao - Cha Lo (Vietnam); Pahang - Long Sap (Vietnam); Panghok - Tây Trang (Vietnam); Phoukeua - Bo Y (Vietnam)) of the 33 border crossings are only open to regular visa holders.; e-Visa may be used to enter Laos through the Luang Prabang, Pakse and Vientiane international airports, 3 Thai-Lao Friendship Bridges (Note: Vientiane (Friendship Bridge 1); Savannakhet (Friendship Bridge 2); Bokeo (Friendship Bridge 4)), in Boten (road and railroad), and in Vientiane (at Khamsavath railway station).; Visa on arrival is available at the Luang Prabang, Pakse and Vientiane international airports, 4 Thai-Lao Friendship Bridges (Note: Vientiane (Friendship Bridge 1); Savannakhet (Friendship Bridge 2); Khammouane (Friendship Bridge 3); Bokeo (Friendship Bridge 4)) and 7 border crossings. (Note: Nongnokkheane - Trapeang Kriel (Cambodia); Boten - Bo han (China); Golden Triangle/Samliemkham (Thailand); Khamsavath railway station (Thailand); Namheuang - Ban Na Kraseng (Thailand); Vang tao - Chongmek (Thailand); Dansavan - Lao Bảo (Vietnam)) | X |
| Latvia | Visa not required | 90 days | 90 days within any 180 day period in the Schengen Area. | ✓ |
| Lebanon | Free Visa on arrival | 1 month | Extendable for 2 additional months; Granted free of charge at Beirut International Airport or any other port of entry if there is no Israeli visa or seal, holding a telephone number, an address in Lebanon, and a non refundable return or circle trip ticket. | X |
| Lesotho | eVisa | | | X |
| Liberia | eVisa | | Pre-approved visa can be picked up on arrival. | ✓ |
| Libya | eVisa | | | ✓ |
| Liechtenstein | Visa not required | 90 days | 90 days within any 180 day period in the Schengen Area. | ✓ |
| Lithuania | Visa not required | 90 days | 90 days within any 180 day period in the Schengen Area. | ✓ |
| Luxembourg | Visa not required | 90 days | 90 days within any 180 day period in the Schengen Area. | ✓ |
| Madagascar | eVisa/Visa on arrival | 60 days | | X |
| Malawi | eVisa / Visa on arrival | 90 days | | X |
| Malaysia | Visa not required | 30 days | | ✓ |
| Maldives | Free visa on arrival | 30 days | | X |
| Mali | Visa required | | | ✓ |
| Malta | Visa not required | 90 days | 90 days within any 180 day period in the Schengen Area. | ✓ |
| Marshall Islands | Visa on arrival | 90 days | | X |
| Mauritania | eVisa | | Available at Nouakchott–Oumtounsy International Airport. | X |
| Mauritius | Visa on arrival | 60 days | | ✓ |
| Mexico | Visa required | | Visa not required for holders of a valid visa issued by the US and permanent residents of the European Union. | X |
| Micronesia | Visa not required | 30 days | | X |
| Moldova | Visa not required | 90 days | 90 days within any 180 day period. | ✓ |
| Monaco | Visa not required | | | ✓ |
| Mongolia | eVisa | 30 days | | ✓ |
| Montenegro | Visa not required | 90 days | 90 days within any 180 day period.; Biometric ID card valid for 30 days | ✓ |
| Morocco | Visa required | | Holders of valid visa of the United States can apply for e-Visa. | ✓ |
| Mozambique | eVisa / Visa on arrival | 30 days | | X |
| Myanmar | Visa required | | | ✓ |
| Namibia | Visa required | | | ✓ |
| Nauru | Visa required | | | ✓ |
| Nepal | Online Visa / Visa on arrival | 90 days | | X |
| Netherlands | Visa not required | 90 days | 90 days within any 180 day period in the Schengen Area. (European Netherlands) | ✓ |
| New Zealand | Visa required | | Holders of an Australian Permanent Resident Visa or Resident Return Visa may be granted a New Zealand Resident Visa on arrival permitting indefinite stay (pursuant to the Trans-Tasman Travel Arrangement), subject to meeting character requirements and obtaining an Electronic Travel Authority prior to departure. | X |
| Nicaragua | Visa required | | | X |
| Niger | Visa required | | | ✓ |
| Nigeria | eVisa | 90 days | | ✓ |
| Norway | Visa not required | 90 days | 90 days within any 180 day period in the Schengen Area. | ✓ |
| Oman | Visa not required / eVisa | 14 days / 30 days | | X |
| Pakistan | eVisa | 90 days | | X |
| Palau | Free visa on arrival | 30 days | | X |
| Panama | Visa not required | 90 days | | X |
| Papua New Guinea | eVisa | 60 days | Visitors may apply for a visa online under the "Tourist - Own Itinerary" category. | ✓ |
| Paraguay | Visa required | | | X |
| Peru | Visa not required | 183 days | | ✓ |
| Philippines | Visa required | | Residents of the United Arab Emirates may obtain an eVisa through the official Philippine eVisa website. A valid Emirati residence visa must be shown upon an eVisa application. | ✓ |
| Poland | Visa not required | 90 days | 90 days within any 180 day period in the Schengen Area. | ✓ |
| Portugal | Visa not required | 90 days | 90 days within any 180 day period in the Schengen Area. | ✓ |
| Qatar | Visa not required | 30 days | | X |
| Romania | Visa not required | 90 days | 90 days within any 180 day period in the Schengen Area. | ✓ |
| Russia | Visa not required (conditional) / eVisa | 30 days / 16 days | Visa free for holders a letter of invitation or a tourist voucher only. | ✓ |
| Rwanda | Visa not required | 30 days | | X |
| Saint Kitts and Nevis | Electronic Travel Authorisation | | | ✓ |
| Saint Lucia | Visa required | | | ✓ |
| Saint Vincent and the Grenadines | Visa not required | 3 months | | X |
| Samoa | Visa not required | 60 days | | X |
| San Marino | Visa not required | | | ✓ |
| São Tomé and Príncipe | eVisa | | | X |
| Saudi Arabia | Visa not required | | | ✓ |
| Senegal | Visa required | | | X |
| Serbia | Visa not required | 90 days | 90 days within any 180 day period.; ID card valid. | ✓ |
| Seychelles | Electronic Border System | 3 months | Application can be submitted up to 30 days before travel.; Visitors must upload a reservation confirmation(s) for each visitor's location of stay in Seychelles.; Yellow fever vaccination certificate is required if coming from endemic countries.; Payment of the fee (EUR 10) by credit or debit card.; Valid for one journey only and it expires once exit the country. | ✓ |
| Sierra Leone | eVisa | 3 months | Pre-approved visa can be picked up on arrival. | ✓ |
| Singapore | Visa not required | 30 days | | ✓ |
| Slovakia | Visa not required | 90 days | 90 days within any 180 day period in the Schengen Area. | ✓ |
| Slovenia | Visa not required | 90 days | 90 days within any 180 day period in the Schengen Area. | ✓ |
| Solomon Islands | Visa required | | | ✓ |
| Somalia | eVisa | 30 days | All visitors must have an approved Electronic Visa (eTAS) before the start of their journey. | ✓ |
| South Africa | Visa required | | | ✓ |
| South Sudan | eVisa | | Obtainable online.; Printed visa authorization must be presented at the time of travel. | X |
| Spain | Visa not required | 90 days | 90 days within any 180 day period in the Schengen Area. | ✓ |
| Sri Lanka | eVisa / Visa on arrival | 60 days / 30 days | Sri Lanka introduced an ETA valid for 30 days. | X |
| Sudan | eVisa | | | ✓ |
| Suriname | Visa not required | 90 days | An entrance fee of USD 50 or EUR 50 must be paid online prior to arrival.; Multiple entry e-Visa is also available. | X |
| Sweden | Visa not required | 90 days | 90 days within any 180 day period in the Schengen Area. | ✓ |
| Switzerland | Visa not required | 90 days | 90 days within any 180 day period in the Schengen Area. | ✓ |
| Syria | eVisa | | | X |
| Tajikistan | eVisa | 60 days | Visa free for visitor are aged 55 and over | X |
| Tanzania | eVisa / Visa on arrival | 90 days | | X |
| Thailand | Visa required | | | ✓ |
| Timor-Leste | Visa on arrival | 30 days | Not available at all entry points. | X |
| Togo | eVisa | 15 days | | X |
| Tonga | Visa required | | | ✓ |
| Trinidad and Tobago | Visa required | | Transit visa required. | ✓ |
| Tunisia | Visa not required | 3 months | | X |
| Turkey | Visa not required | 90 days | | ✓ |
| Turkmenistan | eVisa | | Pre-approved visa can be picked up on arrival. | ✓ |
| Tuvalu | Visa on arrival | 1 month | | X |
| Uganda | eVisa | 3 months | | X |
| Ukraine | Visa not required | 90 days | 90 days within any 180 day period. | X |
| United Arab Emirates | Visa not required | 90 days | From April 2025 | X |
| United Kingdom | Visa required | | Travelers do not require a Direct Airside Transit (DAT) visa if they hold a valid entry visa for Australia, Canada, New Zealand or the United States, and a valid airline ticket for travel via the United Kingdom, as part of a journey to or from one of those countries. Additionally permanent residents of the European Union, Australia, Canada and New Zealand do not require a Direct Airside Transit visa. | X |
| United States | Visa required | | | X |
| Uruguay | Visa required | | | X |
| Uzbekistan | eVisa | 30 days | 5-day visa-free transit at the international airports if holding a confirmed onward ticket for a flight to a third country. | X |
| Vanuatu | eVisa | | | ✓ |
| Vatican City | Visa not required | | | ✓ |
| Venezuela | eVisa | | Introduction of Electronic Visa System for Tourist and Business Travelers. | ✓ |
| Vietnam | eVisa | 90 days | Visa free when visit Phu Quoc Island | X |
| Yemen | Visa required | | | ✓ |
| Zambia | eVisa / Visa on arrival | 90 days | | X |
| Zimbabwe | eVisa | 3 months | | X |

== Unrecognized or partially recognized countries ==
| Countries | Conditions of access | Notes |
|---|---|---|
| Abkhazia | Visa required | |
| Kosovo | Visa not required | 90 days, ID card valid |
| Northern Cyprus | Visa not required | 90 days |
| Palestine | Visa not required | Access to Gaza Strip severely restricted. |
| Sahrawi Arab Democratic Republic | | Undefined visa regime in the Sahrawi Arab Democratic Republic |
| South Ossetia | Visa not required | Must notify about arrival in advance. |
| Taiwan | Visa not required | 90 days, temporarily policy until 31 March 2030. |
| Transnistria | Visa not required | Registration required after 24 hours. |

== Dependent and autonomous territories ==
| Countries | Conditions of access | Notes |
United Kingdom
| Anguilla | Visa required | |
| Bermuda | Visa required | |
| British Virgin Islands | Visa required | |
| Cayman Islands | Visa required | |
| Falkland Islands | Visa required | |
| Gibraltar | Visa required | |
| Guernsey | Visa required | |
| Isle of Man | Visa required | |
| Jersey | Visa required | |
| Montserrat | eVisa | |
| Turks and Caicos Islands | Visa required | |
| Saint Helena | eVisa | |
China
| Hong Kong | Visa not required | 14 days |
| Macau | Visa not required | 90 days |
Denmark
| Faroe Islands | Visa not required | 90 days |
| Greenland | Visa not required | 90 days |
Netherlands
| Aruba | Visa not required | 30 days |
| Caribbean Netherlands | Visa not required | 90 days; includes Bonaire, Sint Eustatius and Saba |
| Curaçao | Visa not required | 90 days |
| Sint Maarten | Visa not required | 90 days |
France
| French Guiana | Visa not required | 90 days |
| French Polynesia | Visa not required | 90 days |
| (France) French West Indies | Visa not required | 90 days; includes overseas departments of Guadeloupe and Martinique and overseas collectivities of Saint Martin and Saint Barthélemy |
| Mayotte | Visa not required | 90 days |
| New Caledonia | Visa not required | 90 days |
| Réunion | Visa not required | 90 days |
| Saint Pierre and Miquelon | Visa not required | 90 days |
| Wallis and Futuna | Visa not required | 90 days |
New Zealand
| Cook Islands | Visa not required | 31 days |
| Niue | Visa not required | 30 days |
| Tokelau | Entry permit required | |
South Korea
| Jeju Special Autonomous Province | Visa not required | 30 days |
United States
| American Samoa | Visa required | |
| Guam | Visa required | |
| Northern Mariana Islands | Visa required | |
| U.S. Virgin Islands | Visa required | |
| Puerto Rico | Visa required | |

== See also ==
- Visa policy of North Macedonia
- North Macedonian passport
