= Driving licence in North Macedonia =

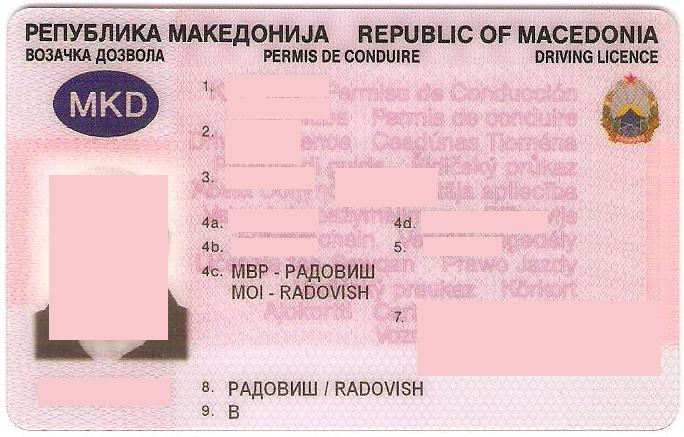
North Macedonia driving licence - front

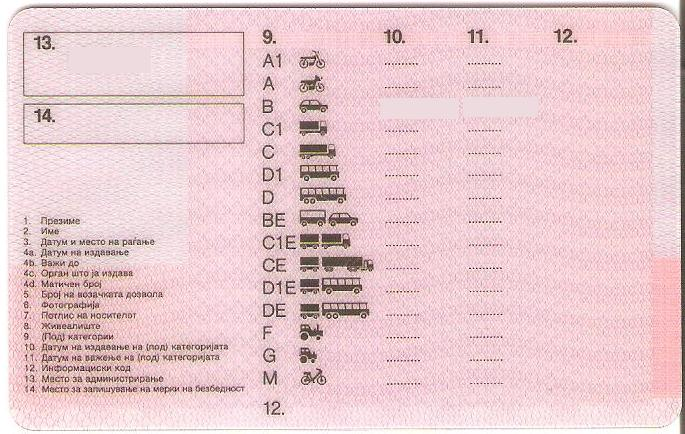
North Macedonia driving licence - back

In North Macedonia, the driving licence (Macedonian: возачка дозвола, Albanian: patentë shoferi) is a governmental right given to those who request a licence for any of the categories they desire. It is required for every type of motorised vehicle. The minimum age to obtain a driving licence is 18 years. Regardless of age, in the first two years after obtaining the licence the driver is called a beginner (Macedonian: почетник), and has limited rights concerning driving speed and when they can drive without a co-driver in the front seat who does not have a drivers licence (until 23:00).

Beginning in 2007, the driving licence format was changed from a pink booklet to a credit-card sized card.

== Obtaining a licence ==
The driving licence can be obtained after finishing a driving school and passing a two-stage test with a theory portion and an on-the-road driving portion.

== See also ==
- Vehicle registration plates of North Macedonia
- Identity card of North Macedonia
- North Macedonian passport
