= Sport in Skopje =

Overview of sports in Skopje, North Macedonia

As the capital of North Macedonia, Skopje is home to several sports teams and venues. FK Vardar and FK Rabotnički are the two strongest and most popular football teams, whilst RK Kometal Gjorče Petrov is the most popular handball team, being a European Women's EHF Champions League champion for 2002.While WHC Vardar are five-time medalists with three bronze and two silver medals at Women's EHF Champions League F4. RK Vardar and RK Metalurg are two main male handball teams. RK Vardar are the Men's EHF Champions League 2017 Champions, and MZT Skopje and Rabotnički are best in basketball.

== Events ==
Recently, Skopje was the host of the following events:

- 2006 W.A.K.O. European Championships
- 2008 European Women's Handball Championship, Skopje Sports Arena
- 2008 Women's Junior World Championship
- 2009 Men's U20 European Basketaball Championship - Division B
- 2010 European Twenty20 Championship
- 2010 UEFA Women's Under-19 Championship
- 2011 Davis Cup Europe Zone Group III
- 2017 UEFA Super Cup (in Toše Proeski Arena)

== Organizations ==
Club	League	Established	Venue
KF Shkupi	Macedonian First League	1927	Čair Stadium
FK Rabotnički	Macedonian First League	1937	Philip II Arena
FK Makedonija Gjorče Petrov	Macedonian First League	1932	Gjorče Petrov Stadium
FK Skopje	Macedonian First League	1960	Železarnica Stadium
FK Vardar	Macedonian Second League	1947	Philip II Arena
FK Lokomotiva Skopje	Macedonian Third League	1954	Komunalec Stadium
FK Gorno Lisiče	Macedonian Third League	1964	Stadium Gorno Lisiče
KF Fortuna 1975	Macedonian Third League	1975	Hasanbeg Arena
FK Ilinden Skopje	Macedonian Third League	1958	Stadion Ilinden
FK Madžari Solidarnost	Macedonian Third League	1992	Boris Trajkovski Stadium
FK Slavija Skopje	Macedonian Municipal Leagues	1919	Jovan Mandarovski Stadium
FK Goce Delčev Skopsko Pole	Macedonian Municipal Leagues	1968	Stadion Kukuš
FK Butel	Macedonian Municipal Leagues	1980	Stadion Butel
FK Sloboden	Macedonian Municipal Leagues	2022	N/A
FK Metalurg Skopje	N/A	1964	Železarnica Stadium
FK Alumina	N/A	1950	Stadion Makedonija
KK Rabotnički	Macedonian Premier League	1946	Gradski Park
KK MZT Skopje	Macedonian Premier League	1966	Jane Sandanski Arena
KK Vardar	Macedonian Second League	1947	SRC Kale
KB Shkupi	Macedonian Second League	1977	SRC Kale
KB Çair 2030	Macedonian Premier League	2016	Shaban Terstena Sport Hall
RK Metalurg	Macedonian Super League	1971	Avtokomanda
RK Vardar	Macedonian Super League	1961	Jane Sandanski Arena
ŽRK Vardar	Macedonian Super League	1961	Jane Sandanski Arena

== Sports venues ==
Skopje has four major sports indoor halls, of which the Boris Trajkovski Sports Arena is the biggest. The main stadium is the Philip II Arena and it hosts the North Macedonia national football team.

Venue	Capacity
Philip II Arena	36,400
Železarnica Stadium	4,000
Boris Trajkovski Stadium	3,000
Gjorče Petrov Stadium	3,000
Boris Trajkovski Sports Arena	10,000
Jane Sandanski Arena	6,500
SRC Kale	2,500
Avtokomanda Hall	2,000
Rasadnik Hall	1,000
Independent Macedonia sport hall	500

== See also ==
- Sport in North Macedonia
