= FK Sloboden =

ФК Слободен FK Sloboden
- Full name: Fudbalski klub Sloboden Skopje; Фудбалски клуб Слободен Скопје
- Short name: Sloboden, SLO
- Founded: 3 June 2022; 4 years ago
- Stadium: Gorno Lisiche (temporary)
- President: Angjel Jankov
- League: OFL Kisela Voda
- 2023–24: OFL Kisela Voda, 4th
Home colours

FK Sloboden Skopje (Macedonian: ФК Слободен Скопје), or simply Sloboden, is a football club based in the city of Skopje, North Macedonia. They are currently competing in the OFL Kisela Voda, the 4th tier of the Macedonian football pyramid.

== History ==
The club was founded in June 2022. Originally, FK Sloboden was an inside joke from 2020, when a Twitter user mistook the word Слободен (free in English) in a youth team fixture list to be an actual football club, rather than the term used to mean that a club got a bye for that round.

Sloboden finished their inaugural season in league football in 8th place, winning a friendly tournament held in R'žaničino in the process.

== Stadium ==
Sloboden has played its home games in a variety of stadiums. After initially using the spare pitch near the Železarnica Stadium to train and play their friendly matches, they moved to the football ground "Jurja" in the Skopje settlement of Usje where they played their home matches in the opening half of the 2022-23 season. Sloboden would then move its home ground at the AMS Trubarevo stadium in the settlement of Trubarevo for the remainder of the 2022-23 season and the opening half of the 2023-24 season.

The club would once again get a new home ground after agreeing to ground-share with FK Euromilk for the remainder of the 2023-24 season.

== Colours and badge ==
FK Sloboden's colours are red and white. The club has used red Nike kits since its founding along with black shorts and red socks. The club's badge is red and white with a robin as the focal point.

Kit history
Period	Kit manufacturer	Shirt sponsor (chest)	Shirt sponsor (sleeves)	
2022-present	Nike	—	Skraten Korner	Napredna Kiropraktika

== Recent seasons ==
Season	League									Top goalscorer	
Season	Division	P	W	D	L	F	A	Pts	Pos	Player	Goals
2022–23	OFL Kisela Voda	17	4	1	12	27	63	13	8th	Andrej Mitrevski; Marios Mitropetros	4
2023–24	OFL Kisela Voda	16	10	1	5	67	23	31	4th	Gjorgji Malov	14

== History list of coaches ==
- (North Macedonia) Stefan Mihajlov (Sep 2022 - Jan 2023)
- (North Macedonia) Filip Jakjimoski (Feb 2023 - Feb 2025)
