= Identity card of North Macedonia =

National identity card of North Macedonia

Identity card of North Macedonia (Лична карта) (Letërnjoftim)
- Type: Identity card, optional replacement for passport in the listed countries
- Issued by: Ministry of Internal Affairs
- Valid in: North Macedonia Albania; Bosnia and Herzegovina; Kosovo; Montenegro; Serbia
- Eligibility: 15 years of age

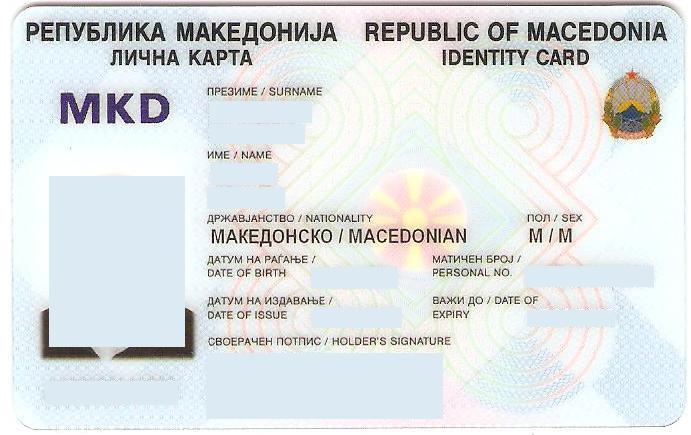
Pre-2019 Identity Card - front

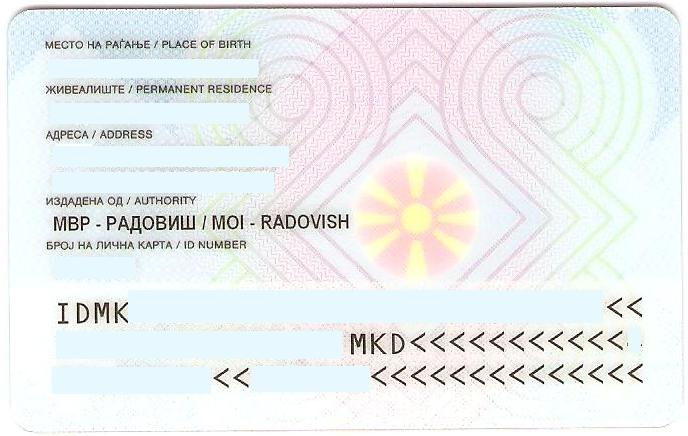
Pre-2019 Identity Card - back

The identity card of North Macedonia (Macedonian: Лична карта, Lična karta, Albanian: Letërnjoftim) is a compulsory identity document issued in North Macedonia. The document is issued by the police on behalf of the Ministry of Interior.

== History ==
Before 1912 the area of modern-day North Macedonia was part of the Ottoman Empire and its subjects had Ottoman identity cards called nüfus tezkeresi (nofuz). After 1912, the territory that was to become North Macedonia was annexed by Serbia and became part of Kingdom of Yugoslavia and the identity documents changed again. From 1945 to 1991, when the present-day Republic of North Macedonia was a constituent republic of Yugoslavia, citizens possessed Yugoslav identity documents. Under the Yugoslav federal system, each republic had its own variety of identity documents; in particular, Yugoslav identity documents issued since 1974 in SR Macedonia were printed in Macedonian, rather than in Serbo-Croatian.

== Physical appearance ==
The identity card of North Macedonia is a plastic ID-1-(bankcard) format. The left side shows a photograph of the face the bearer. On the top left of the front, the name Република Северна Македонија in capitals, and below it the word Лична карта is shown in Macedonian and on the top right the same words in English: Republic of North Macedonia – Identity card. The flag and the coat of arms are also displayed on the identity card. The nationality of the bearer is given as “македонско / граганин на Република Северна Македонија” – “Macedonian / citizen of the Republic of North Macedonia”. Every person over 18 is required to obtain an identity card. The cost for issuing the ID-Card is 310 MKD and is issued in 15 days.

=== Printed data ===
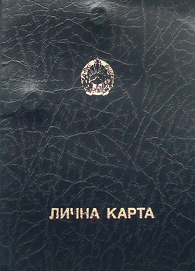
The previous old-fashioned booklet identity card, issued until 2007

The descriptions of the fields are printed in Macedonian and English.

- Front side:
  - Surname
  - Name
  - Nationality
  - Sex
  - Date of birth
  - Personal number
  - Date of issue
  - Date of expiry
  - Holder's signature
- Back side:
  - Place of birth
  - Permanent residence
  - Address
  - Authority
  - ID number
  - Machine-readable zone starting with IDMKD

== International travel ==
The identity card of North Macedonia can be used for travelling to and staying in some countries without the need for a passport on the basis of bilateral agreements:

- Albania
- Bosnia and Herzegovina
- Kosovo
- Montenegro
- Serbia

== See also ==
- North Macedonian passport
- Driving licence in North Macedonia
