= Visa policy of North Macedonia =

Policy on permits required to enter North Macedonia

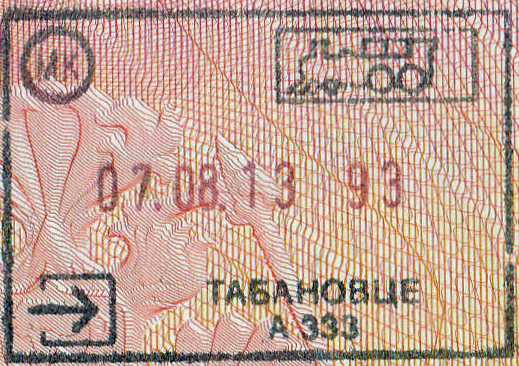
Entry stamp

Visitors to North Macedonia must obtain a visa from one of the North Macedonia diplomatic missions unless they are citizens of one of the visa-exempt countries.

Visa policy of North Macedonia is similar to the visa policy of the Schengen Area. It grants 90-day visa-free entry to all Schengen Annex II nationalities except Dominica, Grenada, Kiribati, Marshall Islands, Micronesia, Palau, Samoa, Saint Lucia, Saint Vincent and the Grenadines, Solomon Islands, Timor-Leste, Tonga, Trinidad and Tobago, Tuvalu and Vanuatu. It also grants visa-free access to the European Union candidate member country of Turkey, whose citizens are still required visa for entry to the Schengen Area unlike the other candidates.

Foreign visitors must have a passport that are valid for at least 90 days from the date of arrival, and show an accommodation booking if they have no residence in the country.

== Visa policy map ==
Visa policy of North Macedonia North Macedonia Visa not required - may enter with an ID card (90 days) Visa not required (90 days) Visa required

== Visa exemption ==
=== Ordinary passports ===
Citizens of the following countries and territories may enter North Macedonia without a visa for the following period:

90 days

- Georgia^{1}

90 days within any 180 days

- All European Union member states^{ID}

- Albania^{ID}
- Andorra
- Antigua and Barbuda
- Argentina^{T}
- Australia
- Bahamas
- Barbados
- Bosnia and Herzegovina^{ID}
- Brazil
- Brunei
- Canada
- Chile
- Colombia
- Costa Rica
- El Salvador
- Guatemala
- Honduras
- Hong Kong
- Iceland^{ID}
- Israel
- Japan
- Kosovo^{ID}
- Liechtenstein^{ID}
- Macau
- Malaysia
- Mauritius
- Mexico
- Moldova
- Monaco
- Montenegro^{ID}
- New Zealand
- Nicaragua
- Norway^{ID}
- Panama
- Paraguay
- Peru^{T}
- Saint Kitts and Nevis
- San Marino
- Seychelles
- Serbia^{ID}
- Singapore
- South Korea
- Switzerland^{ID}
- Taiwan
- Turkey
- Ukraine^{1}
- United Arab Emirates
- United Kingdom^{2}
- United States
- Uruguay
- Vatican City
- Venezuela

_{ID - May enter with an ID card (including Irish passport card) in lieu of a passport.}
_{T - Visa-exempt for tourist purposes only.}
_{1 - For holders of biometric passports only.}
_{2 - For British Citizens and British Overseas Territories citizens only.}

Holders of UN travel documents may enter North Macedonia without a visa.

==== Conditional visa exemption ====
- Belarus
- China
May enter North Macedonia without a visa if they are entering North Macedonia as a tourist and have a "tourist voucher" or are in a travel group organised by travel agencies.
Visa-exempt if the passport is endorsed "for public affairs".

==== Substitute visa ====
Holders of a valid multiple-entry "C" visa issued by any Schengen Area member state may enter North Macedonia without a visa for up to 15 days. They may stay for a maximum of 90 days within any 6-month period.

From 1 January 2026 until 31 December 2026, holders of a valid multiple-entry visa issued by Canada, the United Kingdom or the United States may enter North Macedonia without a visa for up to 15 days. They may stay for a maximum of 90 days within any 6-month period.

Holders of a residence permit issued by any Schengen Area member state, Cyprus or Ireland may enter North Macedonia without a visa for up to 15 days. They may stay for a maximum of 90 days within any 6-month period.

=== Non-ordinary passports ===
In addition to countries whose citizens are visa-exempt, holders of diplomatic or official passports of the following countries may enter North Macedonia without a visa:

- Belarus
- China
- Georgia
- India^{D}
- Iran
- Indonesia
- Mongolia
- Peru

_{D - Diplomatic passports only.}

== See also ==
- Visa policy of the Schengen Area
- Visa requirements for citizens of North Macedonia
