= Usje =

Usje Усjе
- Village
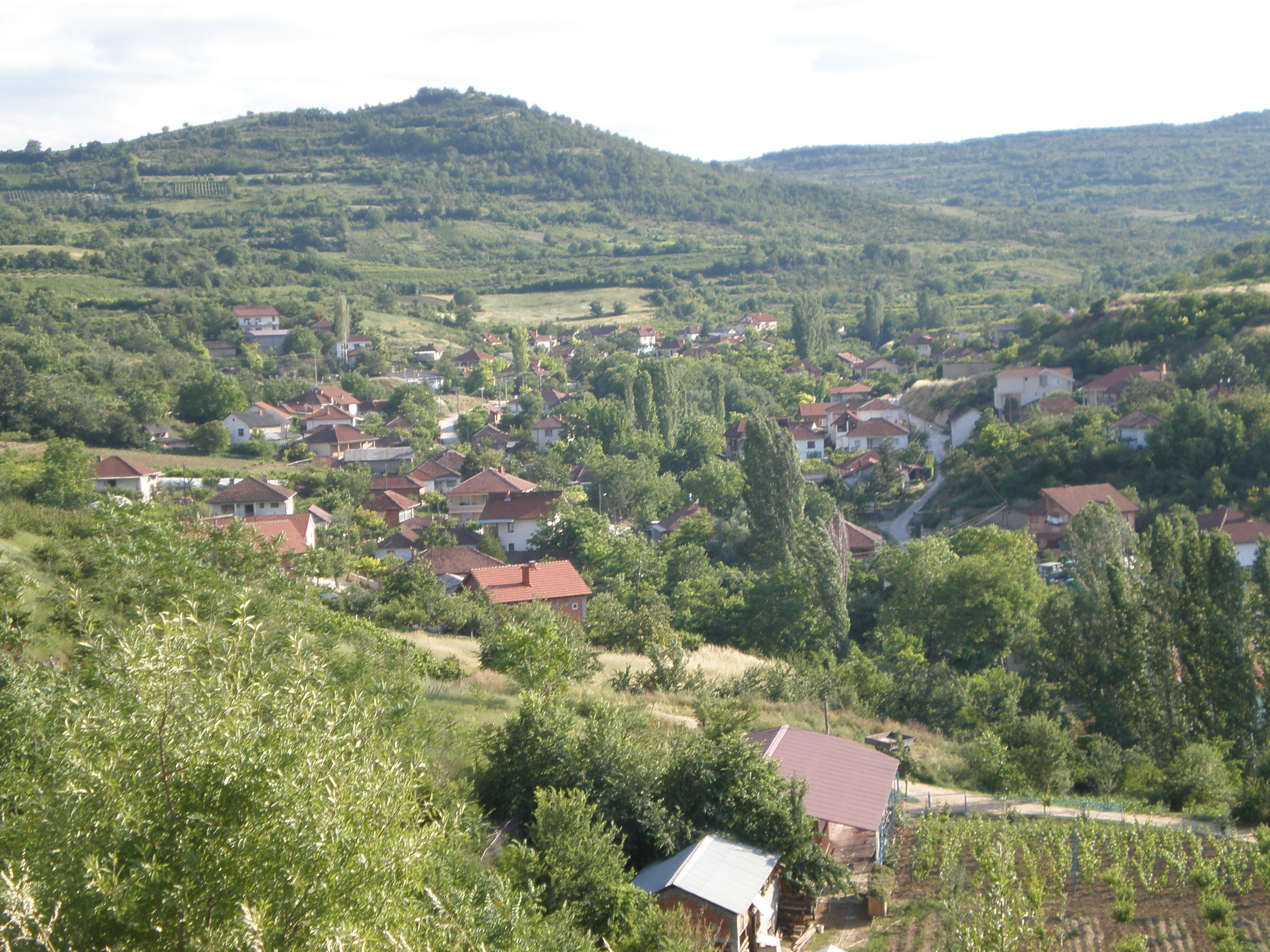

- Location within North Macedonia
- Coordinates: 41.963553°N 21.463005°E
- Country: North Macedonia
- Region: Skopje
- Municipality: Kisela Voda

Population (2021)
  - Total: 1,035
- Time zone: UTC+1 (CET)
  - Summer (DST): UTC+2 (CEST)
- Website: .

Usje (Macedonian: Усjе) is a village in the municipality of Kisela Voda, North Macedonia. It is located just a few kilometers from downtown Skopje.

== Demographics ==
As of the 2021 census, Usje had 1,035 residents with the following ethnic composition:

- Macedonians 970
- Persons for whom data are taken from administrative sources 40
- Serbs 15
- Others 10

According to the 2002 census, the village had a total of 845 inhabitants. Ethnic groups in the village include:

- Macedonians 830
- Turks 1
- Serbs 6
- Aromanians 7
- Others 1
