= Border crossings of Albania =

Border crossings (Albanian: Vendkalimet kufitare) in the Republic of Albania are defined as boundary checkpoints that serve to control the flow of people and goods from neighbouring countries to and from Albania. These checkpoints are administered by the border police authorities that record the entry and exit of each person and vehicle followed by the customs authorities that record the entry and exit of goods and cash. Albania currently has 22 operational land border crossings and shares borders with Montenegro, Kosovo (116.3 km), North Macedonia (186.1 km), and Greece. This article outlines a complete list of Albania's international border crossings, including land, sea and air entry points.

== History ==
During the communist period in Albania, very few people were allowed to leave the country (usually only diplomats) and would also be required to have written permission to do so. Visitors entering the country from outside for any reason, tourism or otherwise, were immediately suspect and closely monitored. Escaping the country was practically impossible with electric fencing, guard dogs and border police instructed to shoot at will if they saw citizens fleeing across the border.

== Land border crossings ==
* Indicates main border crossing

=== Montenegro ===
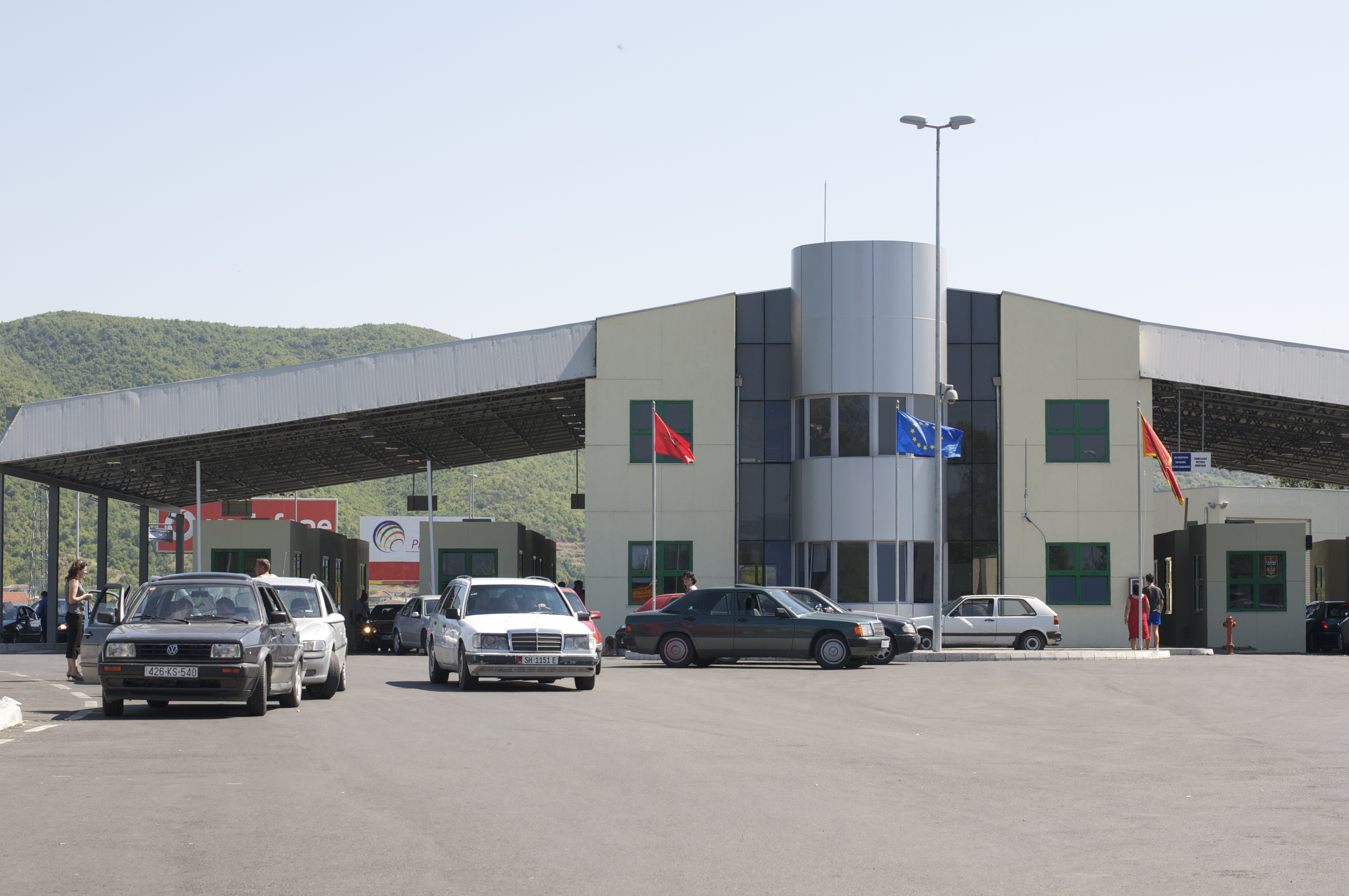
Muriqan-Sukobin integrated crossing between Albania and Montenegro

- Muriqan (Shkodër) – Sukobin, Ulqin
- Han i Hotit (Malësi e Madhe) – Božaj (Podgorica, the main border crossing)*
- Bashkim, Vermosh – Karaula, Vjeternik (Guci)
- Grabom (Malësi e Madhe) – Cem i Trieshit (Cijevna), Podgorica
- planned border crossings:
  - Zogaj (Shkodër) – Hutaj (Skje), Bar
  - Qafë Vranicë (Tropojë) – Plav

=== Kosovo ===
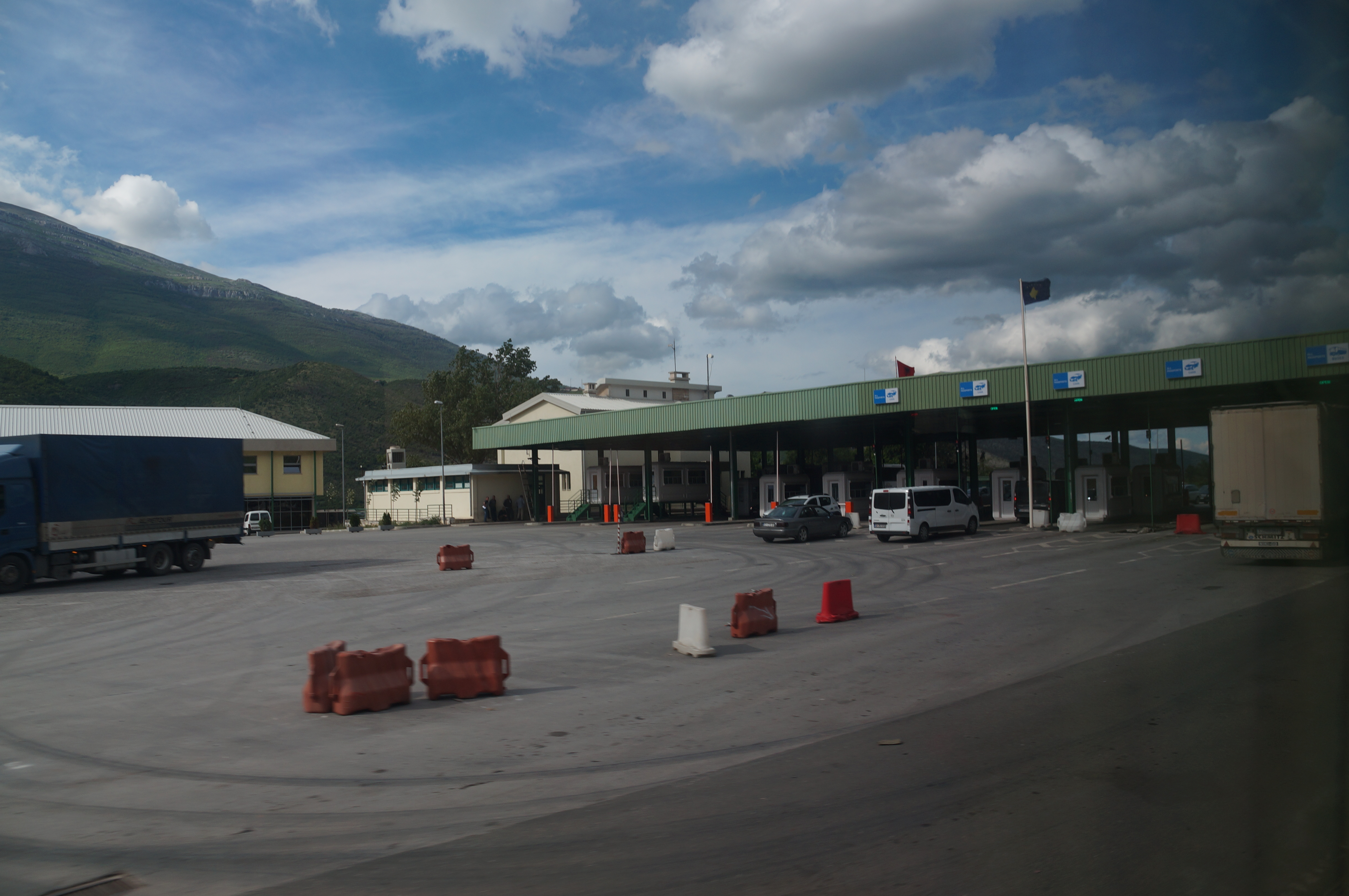
Morinë–Vërmicë border crossing

- Qafë Morinë (Tropojë) – Gjakovë
- Qafë Prush (Has) – Gjakovë
- Morinë (Kukës) – Vërmicë (Prizren, the main border crossing)*
- Orgjost (Kukës) – Orqushë (pedestrian only, not frequently used)
- Borje – Glloboçicë
- Shishtavec (Kukës) – Dragash (opened as normal border crossing on May 10, 2013)

=== North Macedonia ===
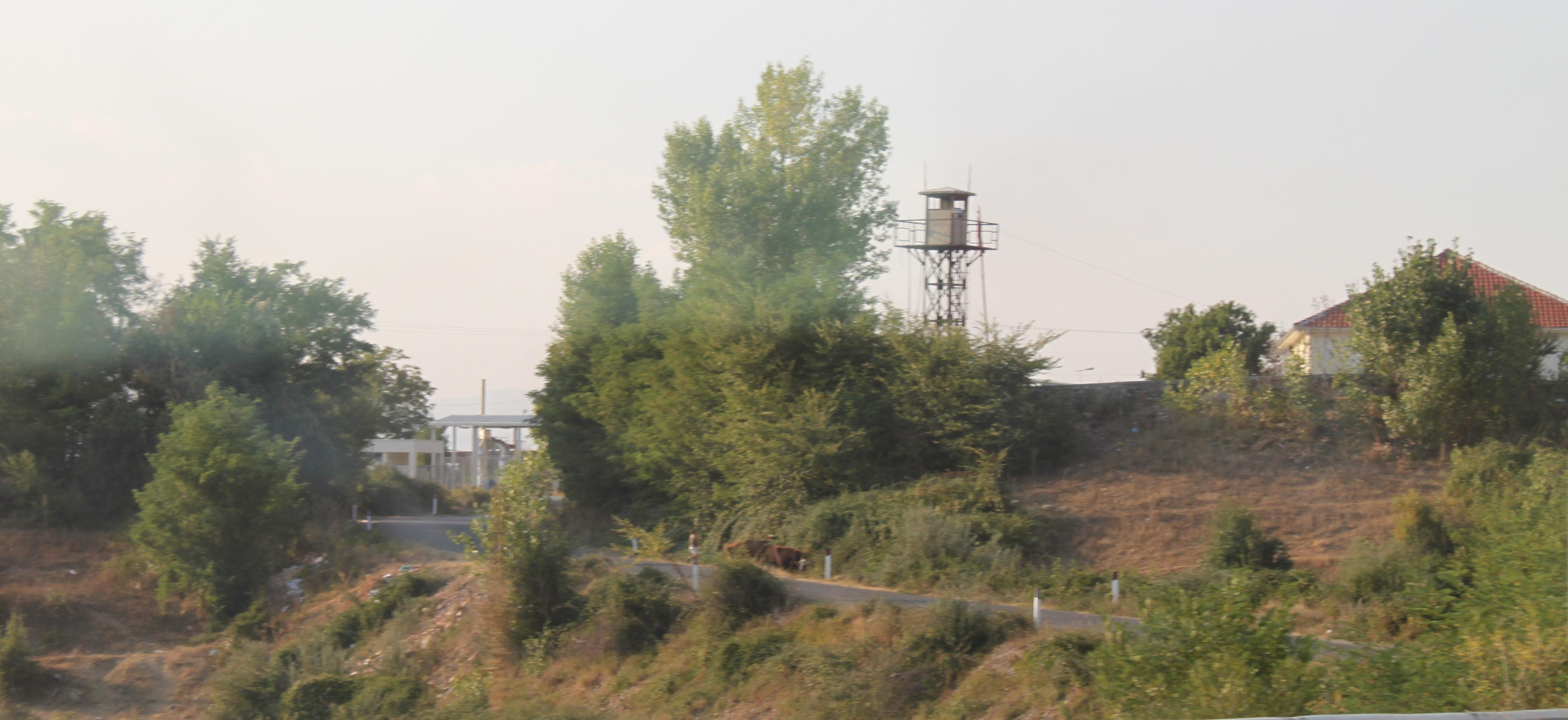
Bllatë border

- Bllatë (Dibër) – Spas (Debar)
- Trebisht (Dibër) – Džepište (Debar)
- Qafë Thanë (Pogradec) – Kjafasan (Struga, the main border crossing)*
- Tushemisht (Pogradec) – Sveti Naum (Ohrid)
- Goricë (Pustec) – Stenje (Resen)

=== Greece ===
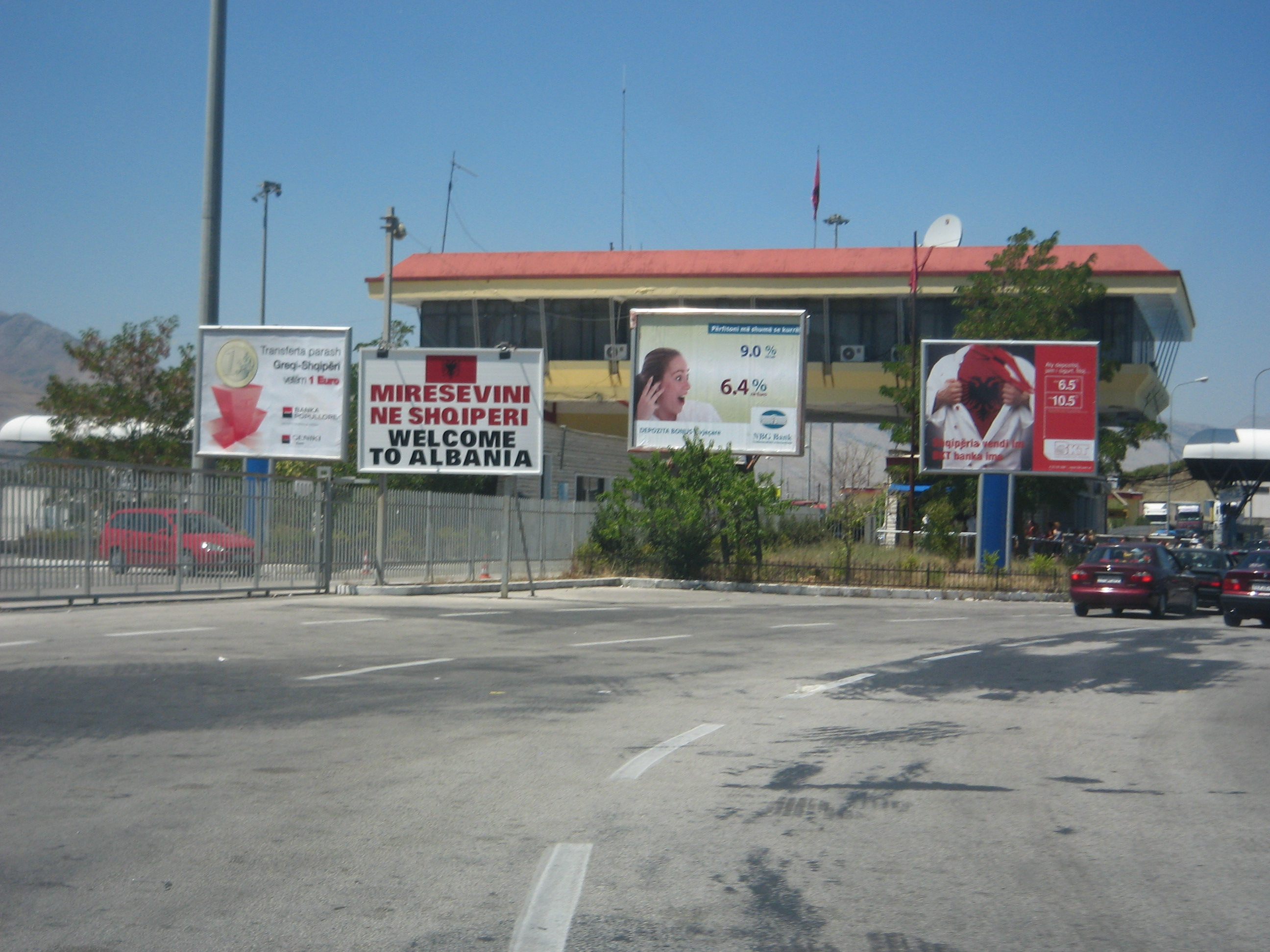
Kakavi border

- Kapshticë (Devoll) – Krystallopigi (Prespes, important border crossing)
- Tre Urat (Përmet) – Melissopetra (Konitsa)
- Sopik (Dropull) – Drymades (Pogoni, pedestrian only, not frequently used)
- Kakavijë – Ktismata (Pogoni, the main border crossing)*
- Rips (Finiq) – Ampelonas (Filiates, pedestrian only, not frequently used)
- Qafë Botë (Konispol) – Sagiada (Filiates)

== Railway crossings ==
=== Montenegro ===
- Podgorica–Shkodër railway (freight only)

=== Greece ===
- Pogradec–Krystallopigi railway (planned)

=== North Macedonia ===
- Pan-European Corridor VIII (under construction)

=== Kosovo ===
- Durrës–Pristina line (planned)

== Maritime ports ==
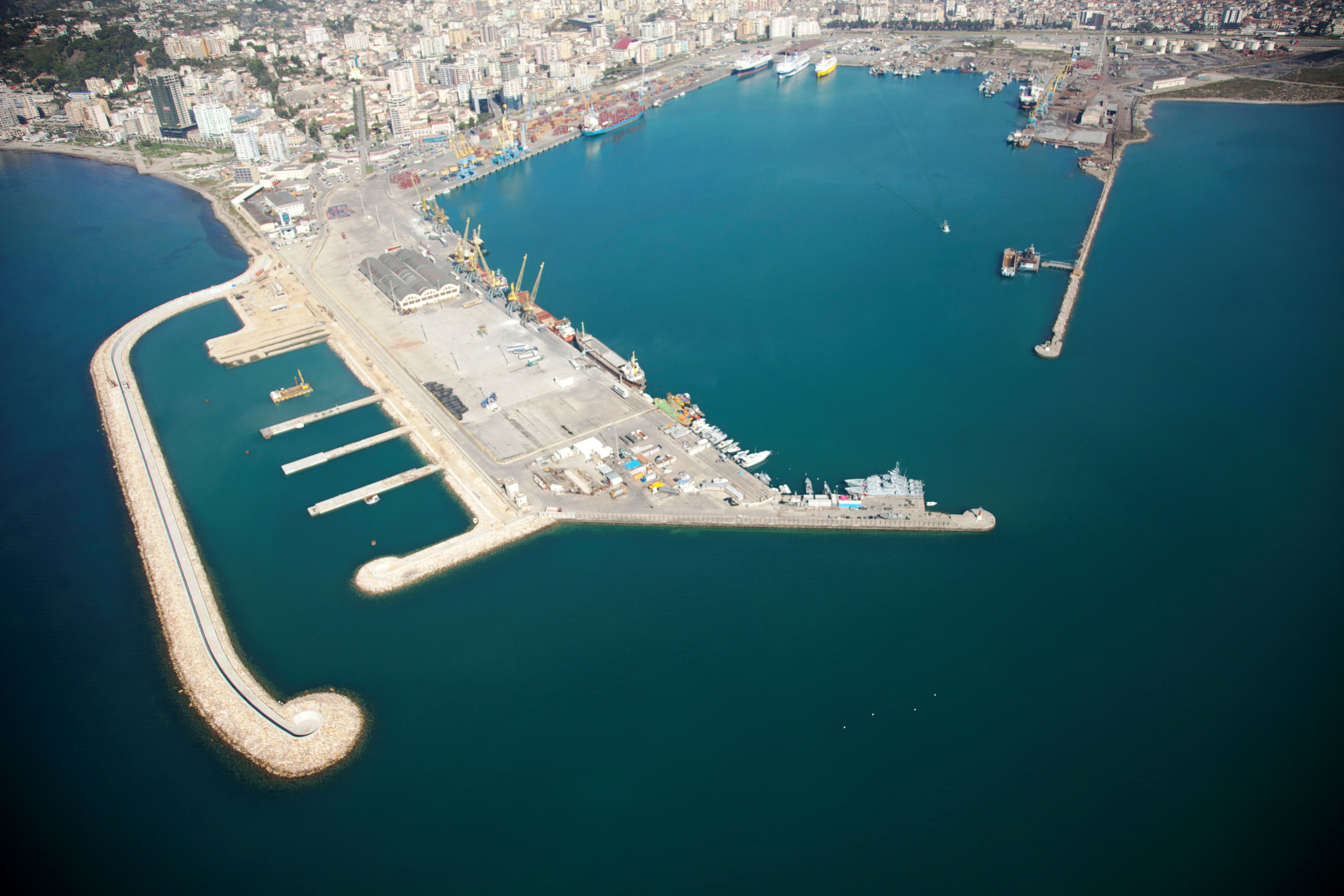
Port of Durrës

- Port of Durrës
- Port of Vlorë
- Port of Sarandë
- Port of Shëngjin

== Airports ==
- Tirana International Airport (TIA)
- Kukës International Airport (KFZ)
- Vlorë International Airport (VLO)

== See also ==
- State Authority for Geospatial Information (ASIG)
