= Albania–Greece border =

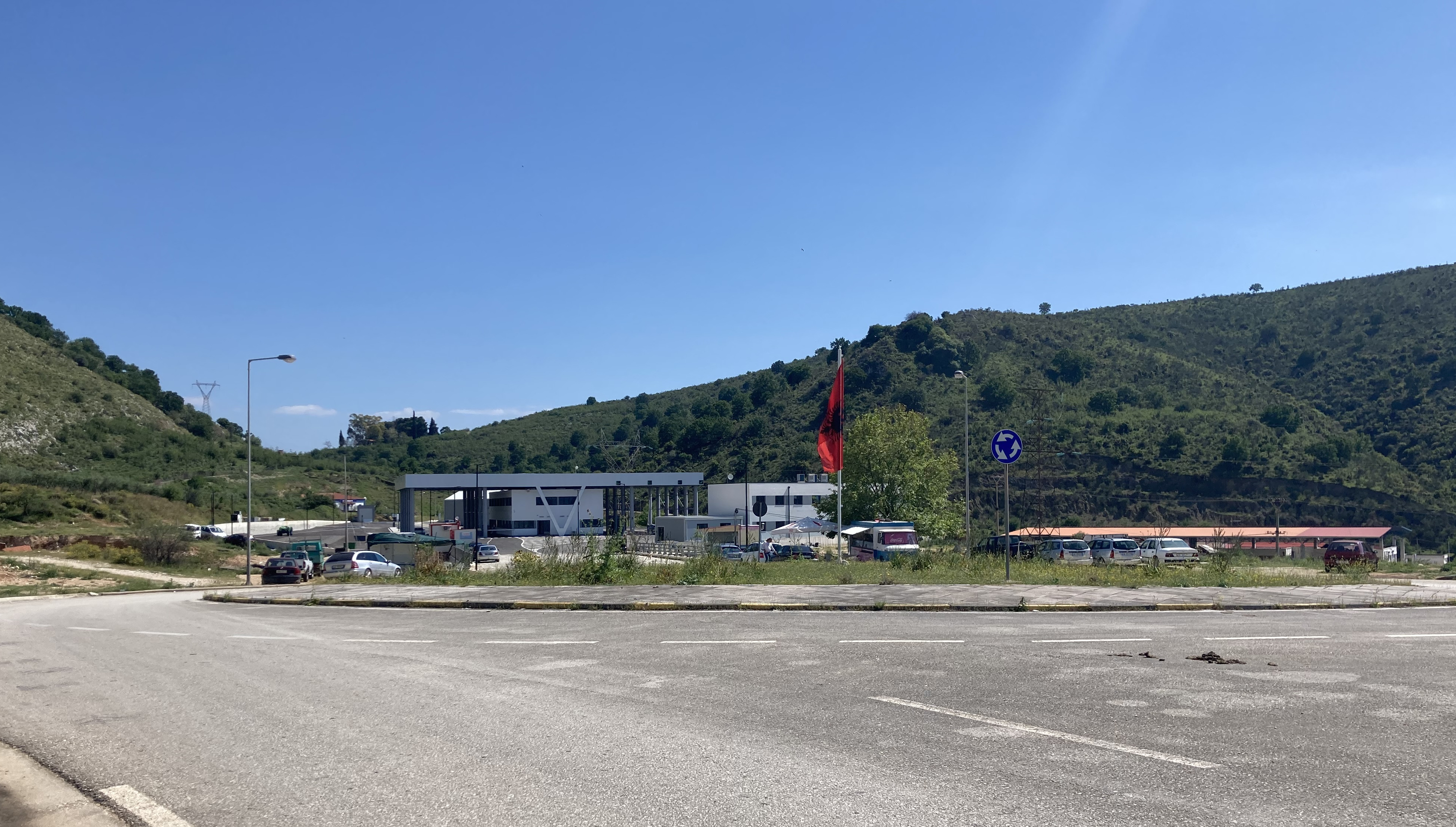
Albania-Greece border crossing near Konispol (albanian side)

The Albania–Greece border separates the Republic of Albania and Greece in Southeast Europe, it has a length of 282 km (175 mi).

The border begins in the West with the strait east of Corfu and continues on the mainland in the municipality of Sagiada. It then continues eastward until it reaches the tripoint with North Macedonia in Lake Prespa.

== Border crossings ==
(Albania) Albanian checkpoint	Municipality	(Greece) Greek checkpoint	Municipality	Opening times	Route in Albania	Route in Greece
Qafë Botë	Konispol	Mavromati	Filiates	24 hours	SH-97	
Rips, Sarandë	Finiq	Ampelonas	Filiates	?	local road (pedestrians only)	local road (pedestrians only)
Kakavijë	Dropull	Kakavia	Pogoni	24 hours		
Sopik	Dropull	Drymades	Pogoni	(intermittent opening)	local road (pedestrians only)	local road (pedestrians only)
Tre Urat	Përmet	Mertsianis	Konitsa	7:00-19:00	SH-80	local road
Kapshticë	Devoll	Krystallopigi	Prespes	24 hours		
