= Border and Migration Police (Albania) =

Border and Migration Police "Policia Kufitare dhe Migracionit"
- Official Patch
- Common name: Policia Kufitare
- Abbreviation: Border Police

Agency overview
- Formed: 25 February, 1991

Jurisdictional structure
- National agency: Albania
- Operations jurisdiction: Albania
- General nature: Local civilian police

Operational structure
- Headquarters: Tirana, Rruga Rexhep Preza
- Agency executive: Director, Sajmir Muçaj
- Parent agency: Albania State Police

The Border and Migration Police (Albanian: Policia Kufitare dhe Migracionit) is a law enforcement branch of the Albanian State Police. It is tasked to oversee and control the transiting of goods and persons across the country's territory. The Border and Migration Police carries out enforcement measures to prevent the illegal border crossings of foreign nationals and nationals engaged in the illegal trafficking of goods. It cooperates with other state police branches in effort to facilitate an efficient management of the borders that are safe and secure.

== History ==
The history of the Albanian border and migration police reflects the country's efforts to manage its borders, ensure national security, and regulate migration flows. Albania, located in Southeast Europe, has a complex history shaped by its geopolitical position, including its proximity to other European countries and its history of political and social changes.

1. Pre-Communist Era: Before the establishment of the Communist regime in Albania in the mid-20th century, border control was relatively loose and often managed by local authorities. The country's borders were porous, and migration was not heavily regulated.
2. Communist Era: During the Communist period under Enver Hoxha, Albania's borders were tightly controlled to prevent citizens from leaving the country. The regime implemented strict measures, including minefields along the borders, guard towers, and shoot-to-kill orders to deter defection. This period saw minimal legal migration but significant illegal emigration attempts.
3. Post-Communist Transition: With the collapse of communism in the early 1990s, Albania underwent a period of significant political and social upheaval. The transition to democracy brought about changes in border control policies. Albania began to open up to the world, leading to increased migration both into and out of the country.
4. European Integration: In the late 20th and early 21st centuries, Albania pursued closer ties with Europe, including aspirations for European Union (EU) membership. This led to efforts to modernize border control and migration management systems to align with EU standards. Albania received support and assistance from European agencies to enhance its border security and manage migration effectively. Albania has been closely cooperating with European Police FRONTEX.
5. Current Situation: Today, Albania's border and migration police are responsible for enforcing immigration laws, managing border security, and preventing illegal migration. They work to secure Albania's borders, combat human trafficking and smuggling, and process legal migration according to national and international regulations.

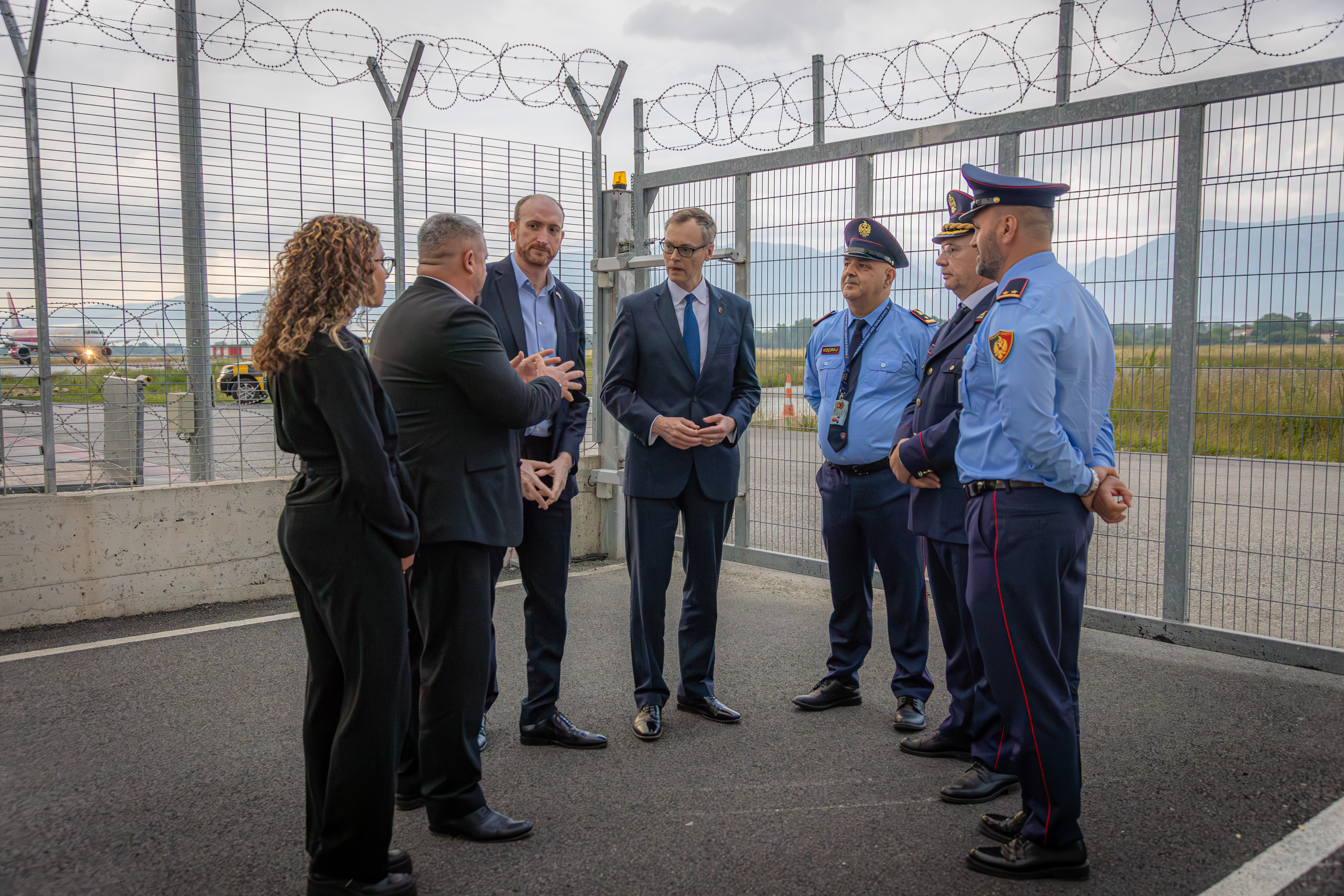
United Kingdom Minister for Countering Illegal Migration Michael Tomlinson in Tirana International Airport.

In recent years, Albania has faced challenges related to irregular migration, particularly from neighboring countries and regions affected by conflict and instability. The country has implemented various measures, including border patrols, surveillance technology, and cooperation with international organizations, to address these challenges while also facilitating legal migration and mobility.

In 2023 Albanian Border & Migration Police successfully managed a flux of 9,000,000 (Total of the Year) passengers traveling into the country at Tirana International Airport, with little to no accidents during that year.

Overall, the history of the Albanian border and migration police reflects the country's efforts to balance security concerns with the need to facilitate legitimate travel and migration, all within the context of its evolving political, economic, and social landscape.

== Stations of the Border Police ==
=== Land Borders ===
Albania shares its borders with several countries, and there are multiple border points for crossing into and out of the country. Here are some of the main border crossings:

1. Albania–Montenegro border: The main border crossings between Albania and Montenegro are at Hani i Hotit (near Shkodër) and Muriqan.
2. Albania–Kosovo border: The main border crossings between Albania and Kosovo are at Qafë Morinë (near Kukës) and Qafë Prush.
3. Albania–North Macedonia border: The main border crossings between Albania and North Macedonia are at Qafë Thana (near Peshkopi) and Qafë Bote (near Debar).
4. Albania–Greece border: The main border crossings between Albania and Greece are at Kakavija (near Gjirokastër) and Kapshticë (near Korçë).

These are some of the primary border points, but there are also smaller crossings and checkpoints along the borders.

=== Port Borders ===
Albania has several ports along its coastline, which serve as key points of entry and departure for maritime traffic. Some of the major ports in Albania include:

1. Port of Durrës: Located in the city of Durrës, this is the largest port in Albania and one of the main gateways for maritime trade in the country. It handles a variety of cargo, including containers, bulk cargo, and general cargo.
2. Port of Vlorë: Situated in the city of Vlorë, this port serves as an important hub for shipping and trade in the southern part of Albania. It also has facilities for handling various types of cargo.
3. Port of Shëngjin: Located near the town of Shëngjin, this port primarily handles cargo related to the oil industry, as well as general cargo and containers.
4. Port of Sarandë: Situated in the town of Sarandë, this port mainly serves passenger ferries traveling between Albania and Corfu, Greece. It also handles some cargo traffic.
5. Port of Porto Romano: This port, located near the city of Durrës, is primarily used for industrial purposes, including the shipment of petroleum products.

These are some of the main ports in Albania, but there are also smaller ports and harbors along the coastline that support various maritime activities.

=== Airports ===
Albania has three international airports:

1. Tirana International Airport (Nënë Tereza): Located near the capital city of Tirana, this is the largest airport in Albania and serves as the main gateway to the country. It offers flights to various destinations in Europe, the Middle East, and soon direct transatlantic flights to the Americas.
2. Kukës International Airport (Zayed): Located near the town of Kukës, this airport primarily serves as an alternative airport to Tirana International Airport. It is smaller in size and offers limited international flights.
3. Vlora International Airport: Located near the village of Akërni, approximately 10 km north of Vlora City. Expected to become fully operational in November 2025, with the first ever transatlantic flights in Albania.

These are the three main airports in Albania, though there are discussions and plans for the development of additional airports in the country to support its growing tourism industry and transportation infrastructure.

== Cooperation with FRONTEX Agency ==
Frontex, officially known as the European Border and Coast Guard Agency, is an EU agency tasked with coordinating cooperation between national border authorities within the European Union. While Albania is not a member of the EU, it has been cooperating with Frontex through various agreements and initiatives aimed at enhancing border security, managing migration flows, and combating cross-border crime. Here are some key points about the cooperation between Albania's border and migration police and Frontex:

1. Status Agreement: Albania signed a Status Agreement with the European Union and Frontex in 2018, which allowed for the deployment of Frontex teams to assist Albanian authorities in border management operations. This agreement reflects Albania's commitment to strengthening cooperation with the EU on border security and migration management issues.
2. Joint Operations and Activities: Under the Status Agreement, Albania and Frontex have conducted joint operations and activities aimed at enhancing border security along Albania's borders, particularly its borders with neighboring countries. These operations involve sharing information, expertise, and resources to address common challenges such as irregular migration, smuggling, and trafficking.
3. Capacity Building and Training: Frontex provides support to Albania's border and migration police through capacity-building activities and training programs. This assistance aims to enhance the skills and capabilities of Albanian border officers in areas such as border surveillance, document examination, and detection of fraudulent documents.
4. Information Sharing and Exchange: Cooperation between Albania and Frontex also involves the exchange of information and intelligence on migration trends, criminal activities, and security threats. This information-sharing mechanism enables both parties to better understand and respond to challenges at the border and within the broader region.
5. Technical Assistance and Equipment: Frontex may also provide technical assistance and equipment to support Albania's border and migration police in their operations. This could include deploying specialized equipment such as patrol vehicles, surveillance drones, and communication systems to enhance border surveillance and monitoring capabilities.

Overall, cooperation between Albania's border and migration police and Frontex plays a crucial role in strengthening border security, managing migration flows, and combating cross-border crime in the region. By working together, both parties can leverage their respective expertise and resources to address common challenges and promote stability and security in the Western Balkans.

== See also ==
- Albanian Police
- Royal Border Guard
