= List of mountain passes in Albania =

A non-exhaustive list of named mountain passes in Albania.

Mountain passes in Albania

Name	County	Features	Location	Elevation
Bualli Pass	Dibër County		41°28′55″N 20°11′45″E	842 m 2,762 ft
Cangonj Pass	Korçë County	Mount Moravë and Mount Ivan	40°41′37″N 20°54′30″E	848 m 2,782 ft
Krraba Pass	Elbasan County		41°09′57″N 19°57′11″E	800 m 2,625 ft
Llogara Pass	Vlorë County	Ceraunian Mountains	40°11′55″N 19°35′30″E	1027 m 3,369 ft
Muzina Pass	Gjirokastër County	Mali i Gjerë	39°56′24″N 20°13′24″E	572 m 1,877 ft
Peja Pass	Shkodër County	Maja e Harapit, Accursed Mountains	42°26′37″N 19°46′14″E	1710 m 5,610 ft
Qafë Botë	Vlorë County	Greece border	39°39′14″N 20°9′31″E	134 m 440 ft
Qafë Morinë	Kukës County	Kosovo border, Accursed Mountains	42°24′44″N 20°13′14″E	134 m 440 ft
Qafë Prush	Kukës County	Kosovo border, Accursed Mountains	42°18′52″N 20°22′57″E	647 m 2,123 ft
Qafë Thanë	Korçë County	Lake Ohrid	41°3′56″N 20°36′29″E	937 m 3,074 ft
Qafë Vranicë	Kukës County	Montenegro border, Accursed Mountains	42°30′47″N 19°59′3″E	1618 m 5,308 ft
Shtamë Pass	Durrës County		41°31′18″N 19°53′53″E	1223 m 4,012 ft
Valbona Pass	Shkodër County	Accursed Mountains	42°24′21″N 19°48′55″E	1795 m 5,889 ft
