= Trpejca =

Trpejca Трпејца
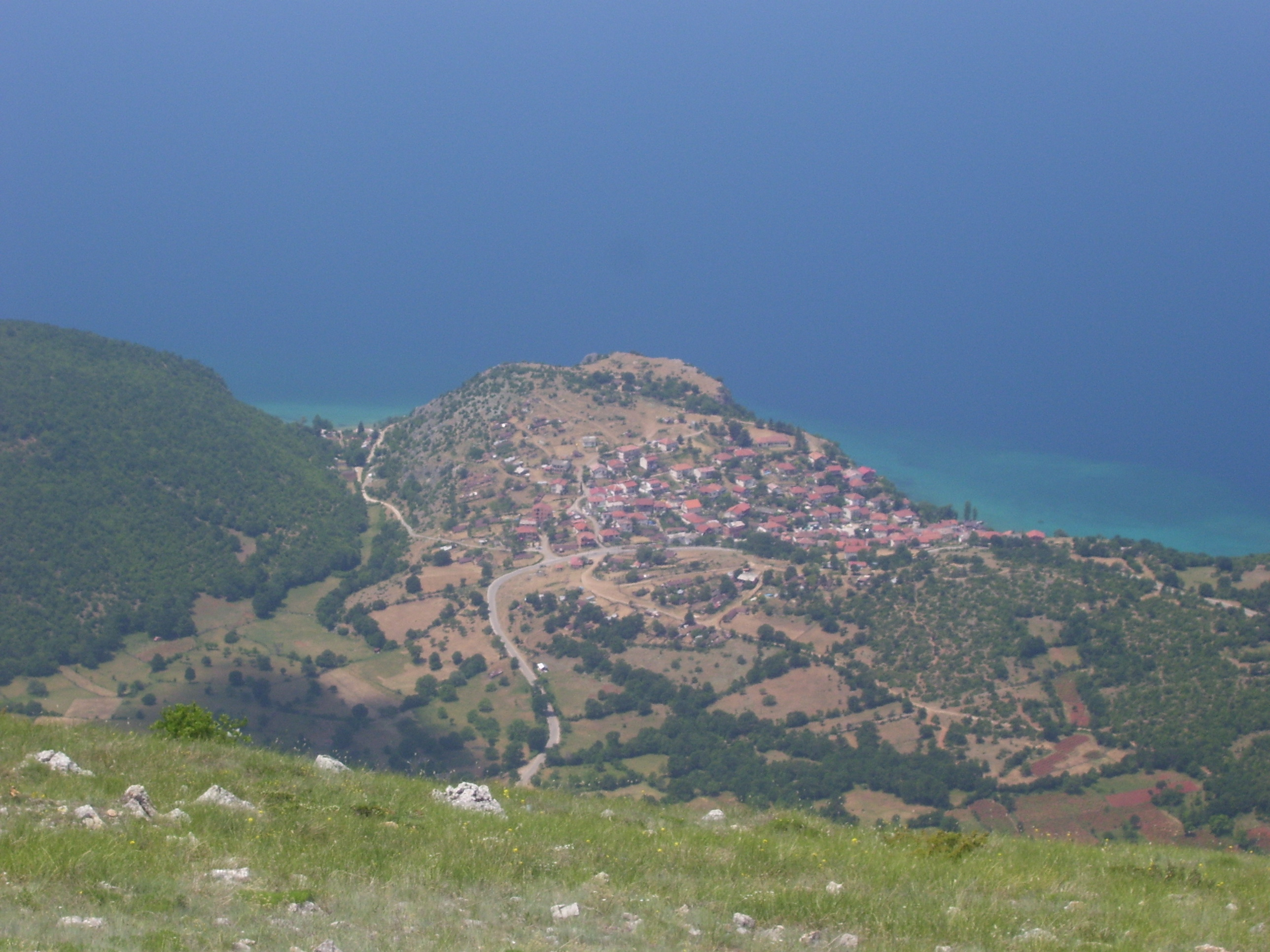
- Trpejca from Galičica

- Location within North Macedonia
- Country: North Macedonia
- Region: Southwestern
- Municipality: Ohrid

Population (2021)
  - Total: 320
- Time zone: UTC+1 (CET)
  - Summer (DST): UTC+2 (CEST)
- Website: .

Trpejca (Macedonian: Трпејца [tr̩ˈpɛjt͡sa]) is a village at the foot of the Galičica Mountain and along the shore of the Lake Ohrid in North Macedonia. Traditionally a fishing village, it has recently become an upscale vacation spot relying heavily on tourism during the summer months. Trpejca is home to around 303 inhabitants and has just one school, two shops, and a church recently built on the exact location of an older one. It is known as the Macedonian Saint-Tropez among locals due to its recent tourist influx.

== Etymology ==
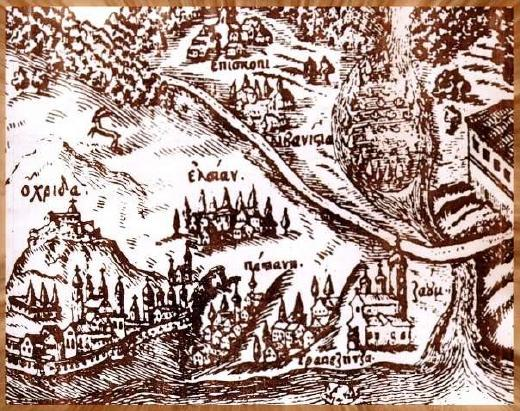
Drawing by the 18th century painter Hristofor Žefarović where Trpejca is pictured as Trapezitsa

The name Trpejca (Trpezica) derives from the Greek Trapezitsa (Τραπεζίτσα) which means "table" because of the table like position of the village on the hill.

== History ==
=== Pre-Modern ===
Local stories tell a tale of the village being named after a woman who was the wife of a man called Trpe, in turn they called her Trpejca. Locals will date the village at various years of age but the common theory is that it began to be settled in the late 16th century. During this time it was involved in and relied heavily on fishing and trading its resources with Ohrid and surrounding Villages.

=== Present ===
In modern times it has become largely a tourist destination during the summer months with the locals relying less on fishing and more on tourism and hospitality. With the forces of urbanisation at work the younger generation tend to reside in the cities of North Macedonia, mainly Ohrid and Skopje. This has led the population of Trpejca to stagnate and has kept it fairly low. Those who do remain continue to live mostly off the land with each family still relying heavily on farming their own food and livestock. In the summer most tend to open their doors as bed and breakfasts for the large number of incoming tourists.

== Demographics ==
As of the 2021 census, Trpejca had 320 residents with the following ethnic composition:

- Macedonians: 294
- Persons for whom data are taken from administrative sources: 22
- Others: 4

According to the 2002 census, the village had a total of 303 inhabitants. Ethnic groups in the village include:

- Macedonians: 303

== Economics ==
Trpejca's residents rely quite heavily on the tourism boom in the summer without which there would be a severe lack of activity in the village. The last decade has seen a number of developments in the village hoping to cash in on the summer business. Many houses were built illegally without approval by the government during the boom period of tourism, and because of this had to be knocked down. Remnants of this are still visible today as many of the demolished houses including some of which are along the shoreline have not been cleaned up and the rubble remains. Most of the tourists entering the village are from North Macedonia itself more specifically from the capital, Skopje. Others include Greeks, Albanians and ex pats coming back to North Macedonia for holiday from places such as Australia, Canada or the US.

== Culture ==
Trpejca has a rich culture and is almost exclusively Macedonian Orthodox. At the beginning of each summer the village celebrates by hosting the Sunset Festival which includes music, food and dancing. The local Church has been rebuilt in recent years with the new church on the exact site of the Old one. There is also a cemetery directly opposite the church. some of the local cuisine includes Gjomlek, Local Pastramka (trout), Belvica and Fish Stew. Tourists and locals alike also engage in a wide range of activities such as Snorkelling, swimming, sunbathing, hiking, boating and fishing. The Village has deep ties to the Mountain of Galičica which stands directly over it. Locals are allowed free entry into the Galičica National Park due to this. Locals also have a small monastery called 'Zaum' in which is only accessible via boat. they celebrate the day of Zaum in July with a feast held at the Monastery which is about an 8-minute boat ride south. Due to its proximity to Sveti Naum, Locals also have strong ties with the day of the Saint Naum in early July.

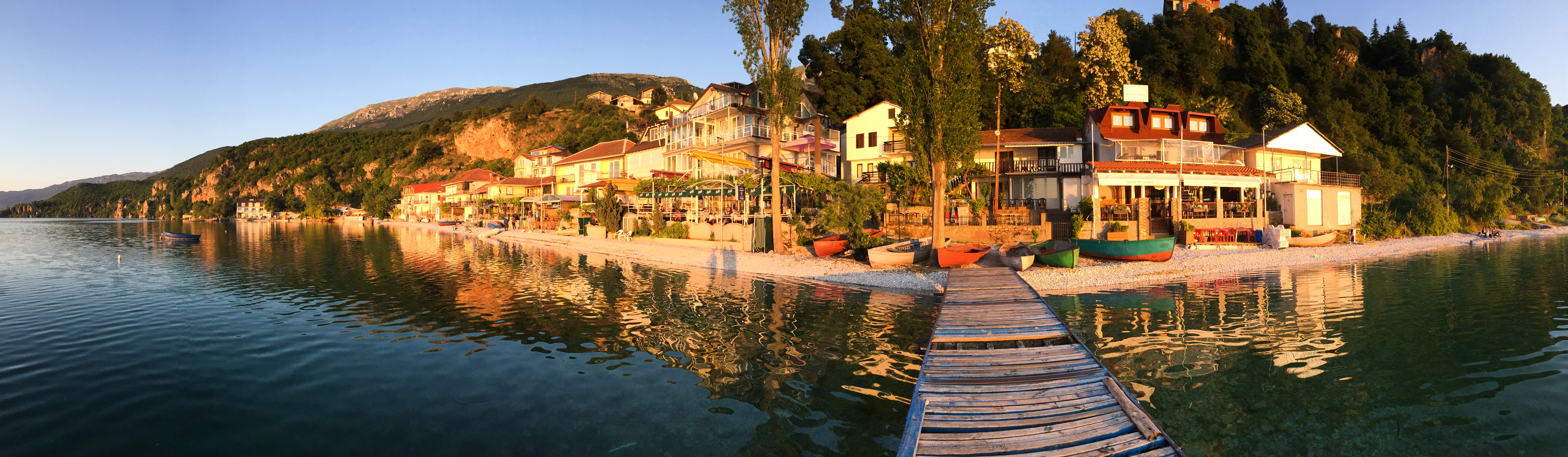
Trpejca panorama from the jetty

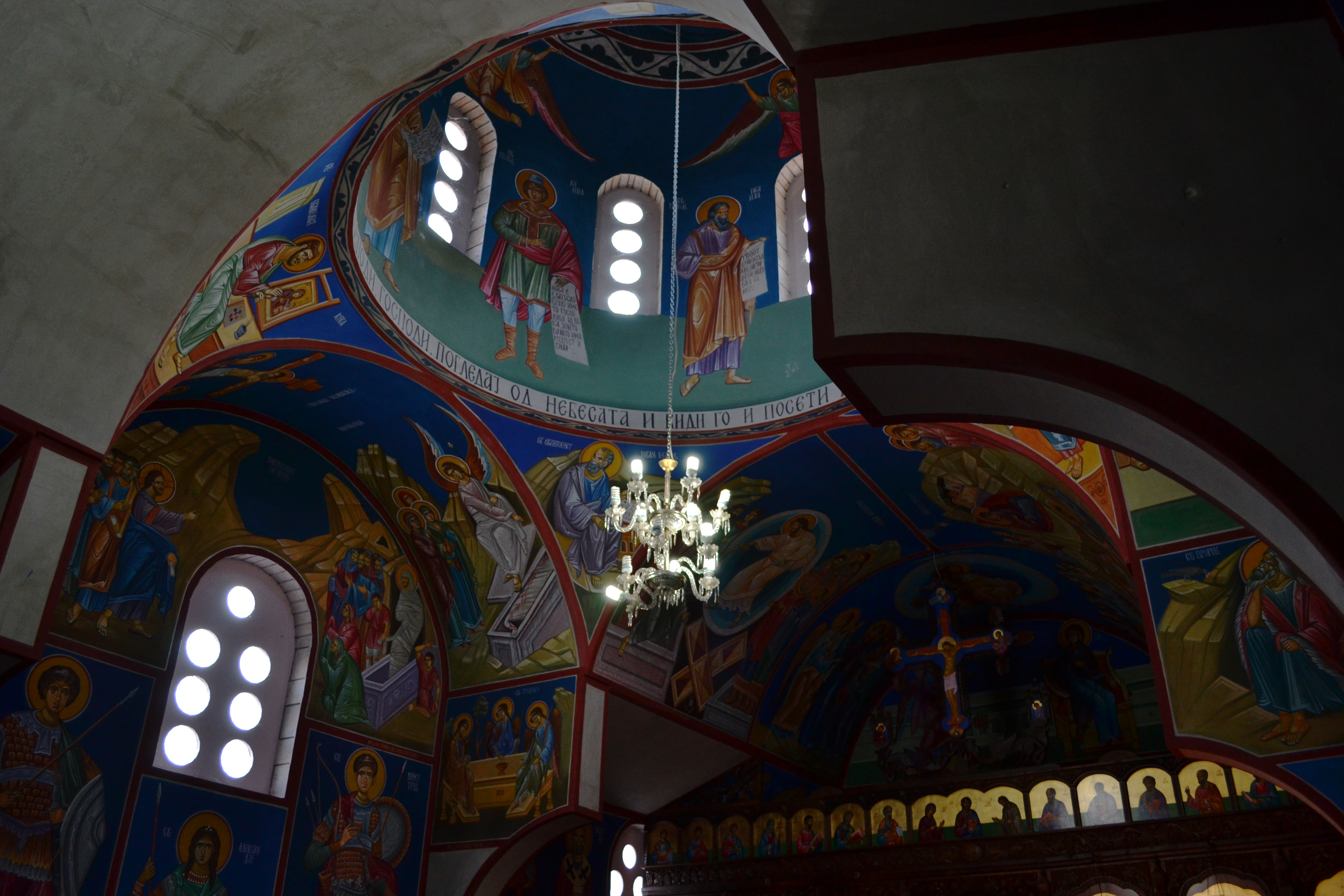
Inside the new church in Trpejca

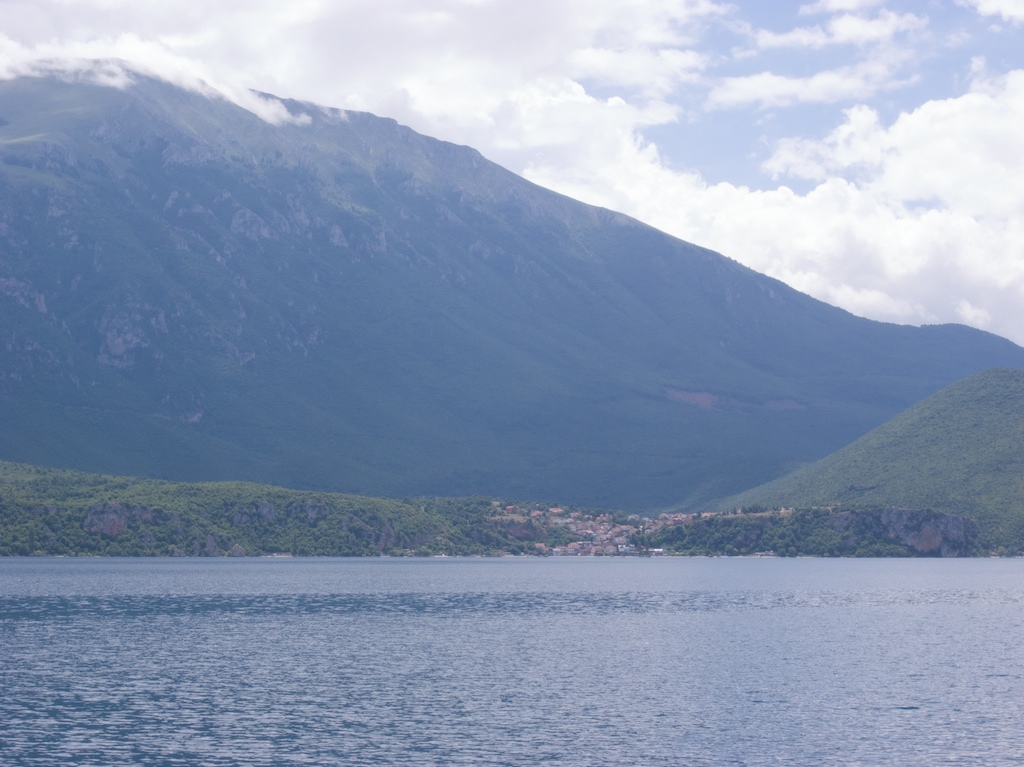
View of Trpejca from Lake Ohrid

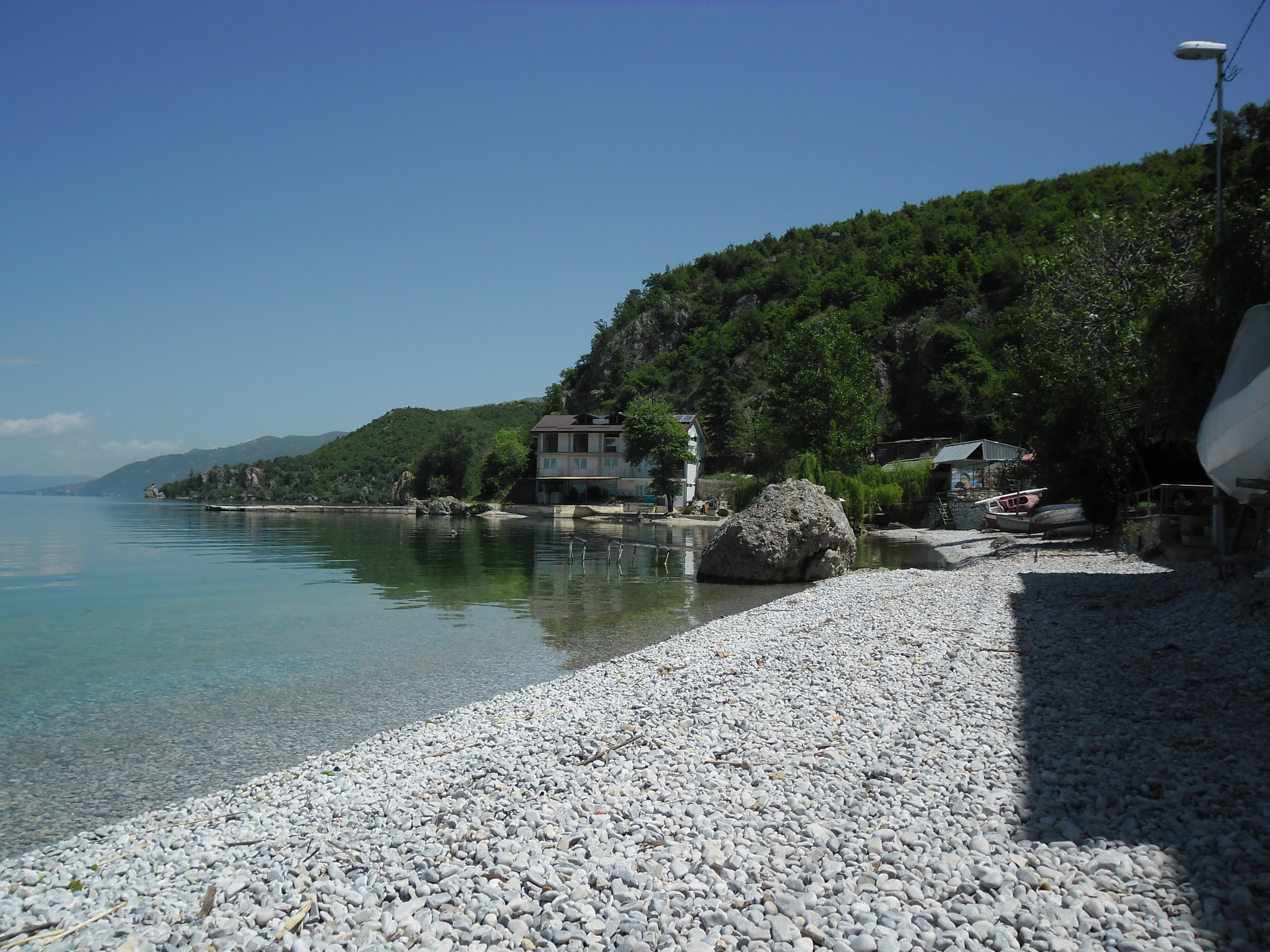
The beach strip in Trpejca

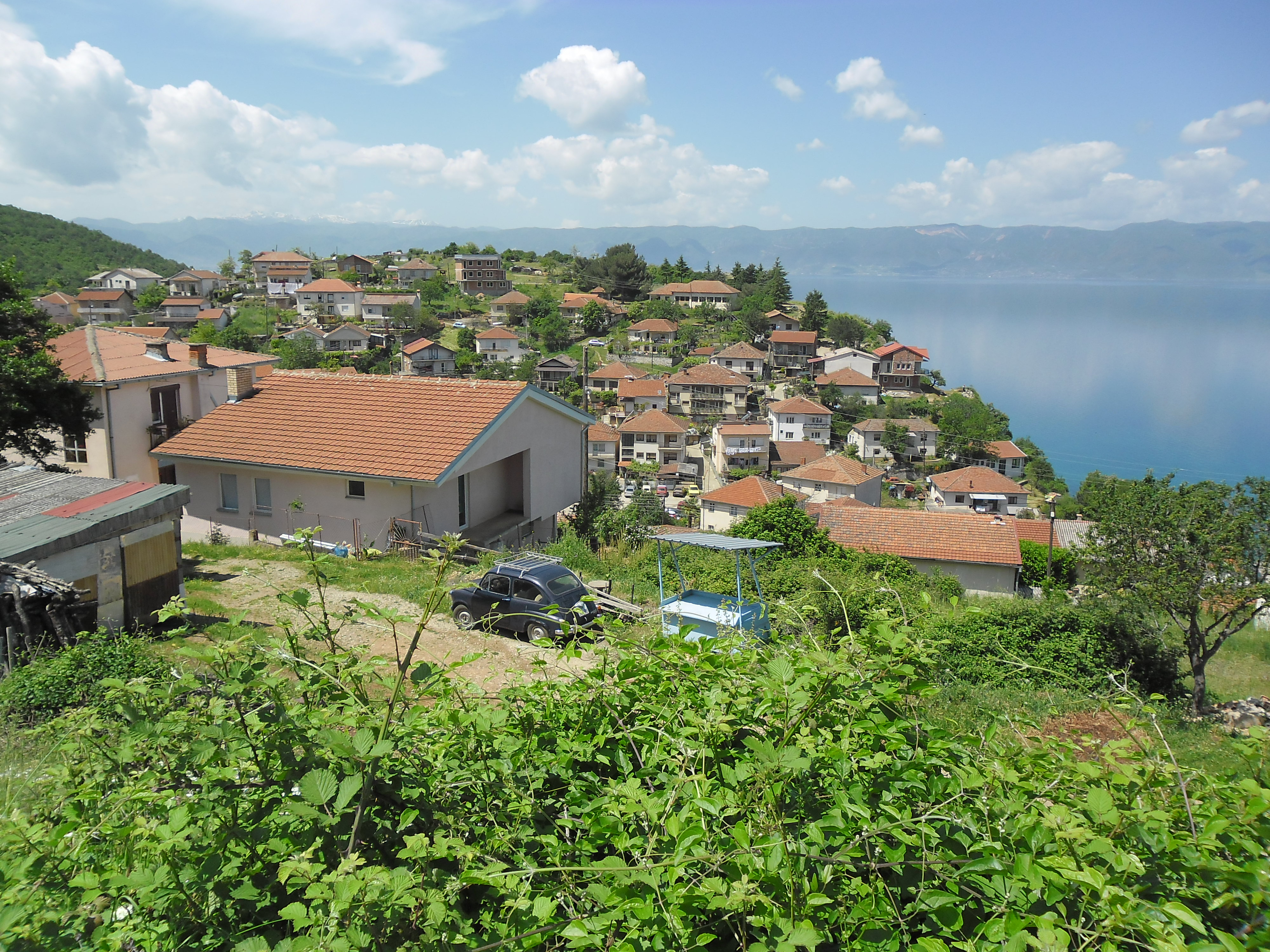
View of the village from the top

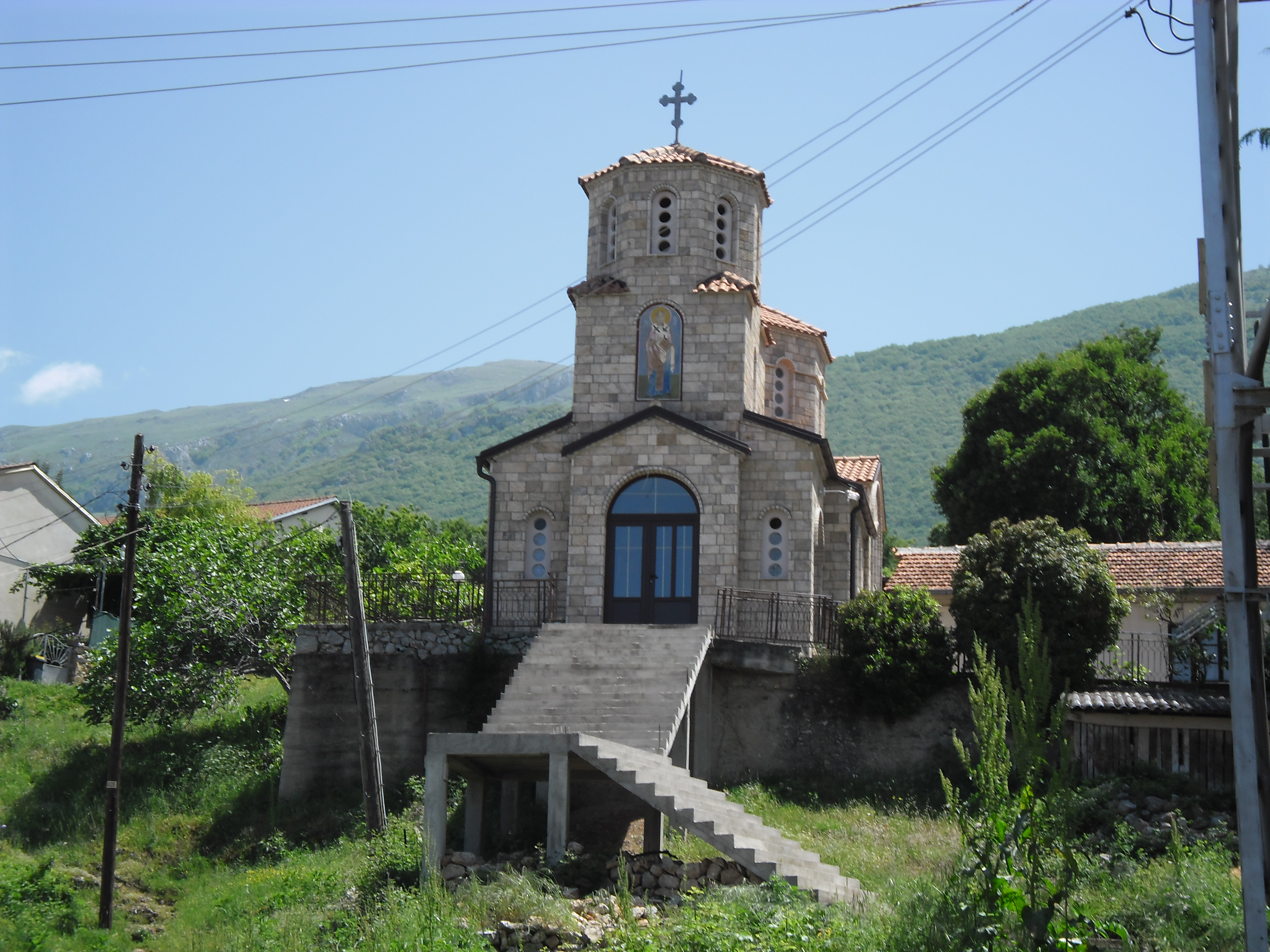
Outside view of the new church

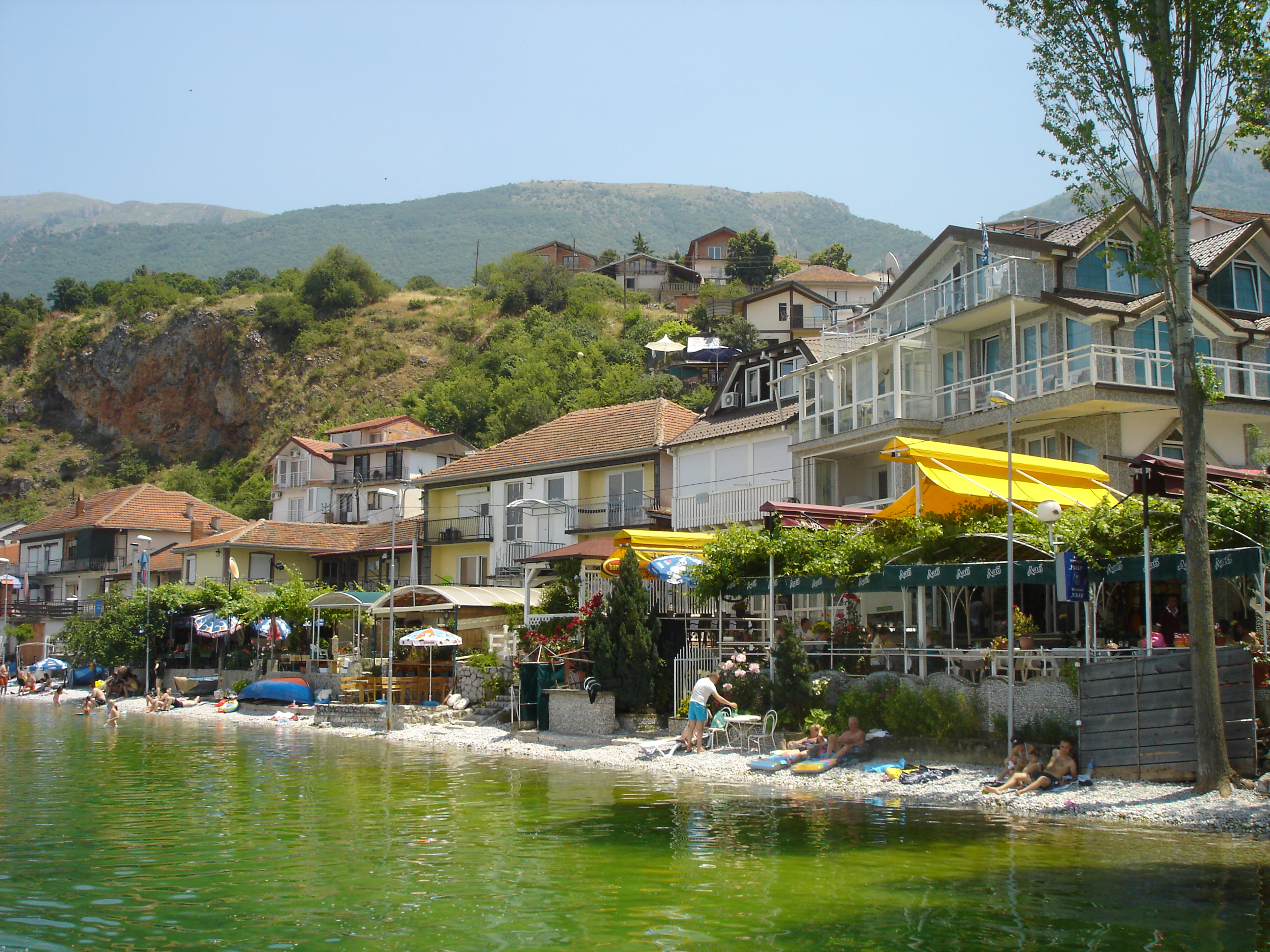
Trpejca shoreline

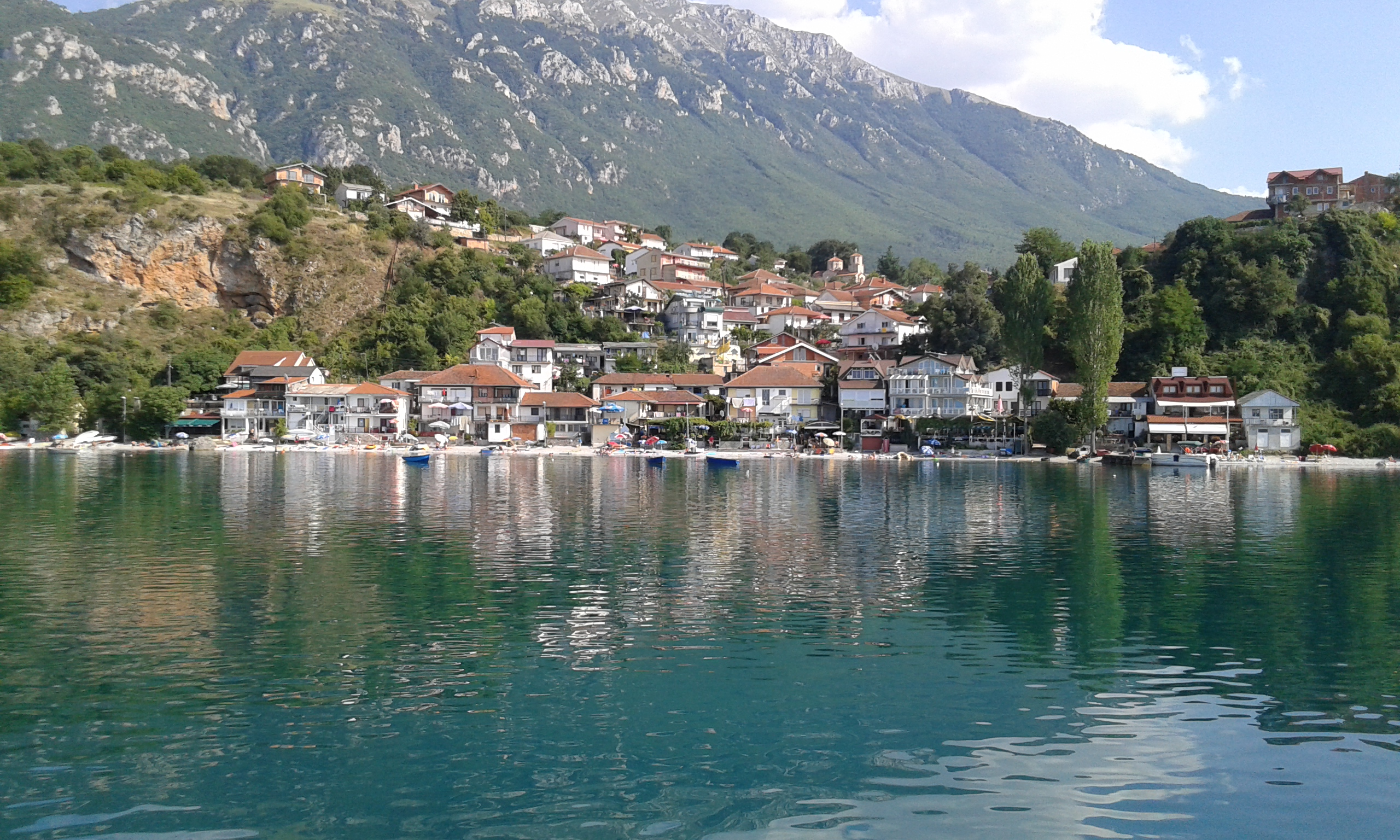
Trpejca from the lake

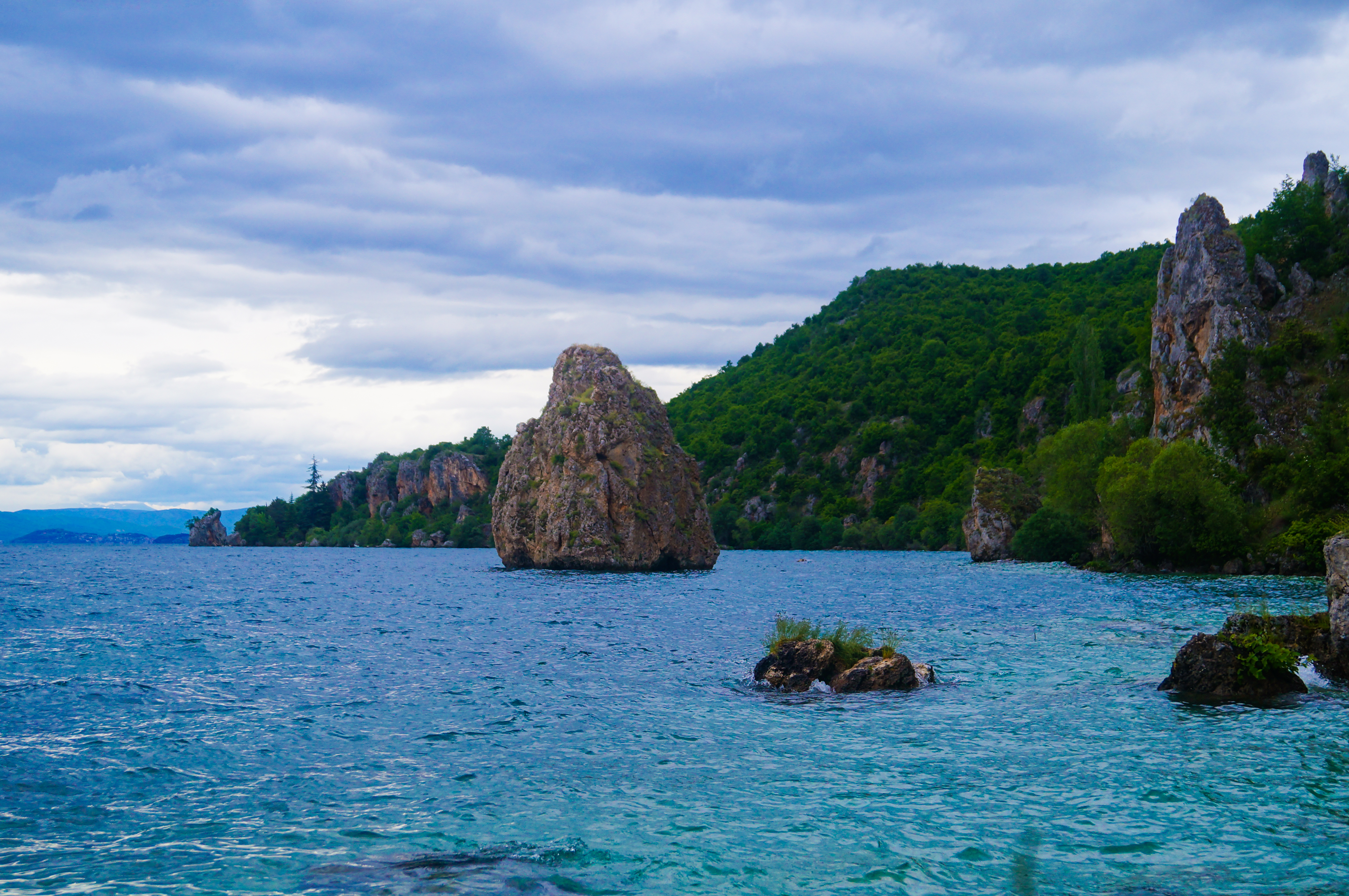
The Famous 'Stog' rock in Trpejca

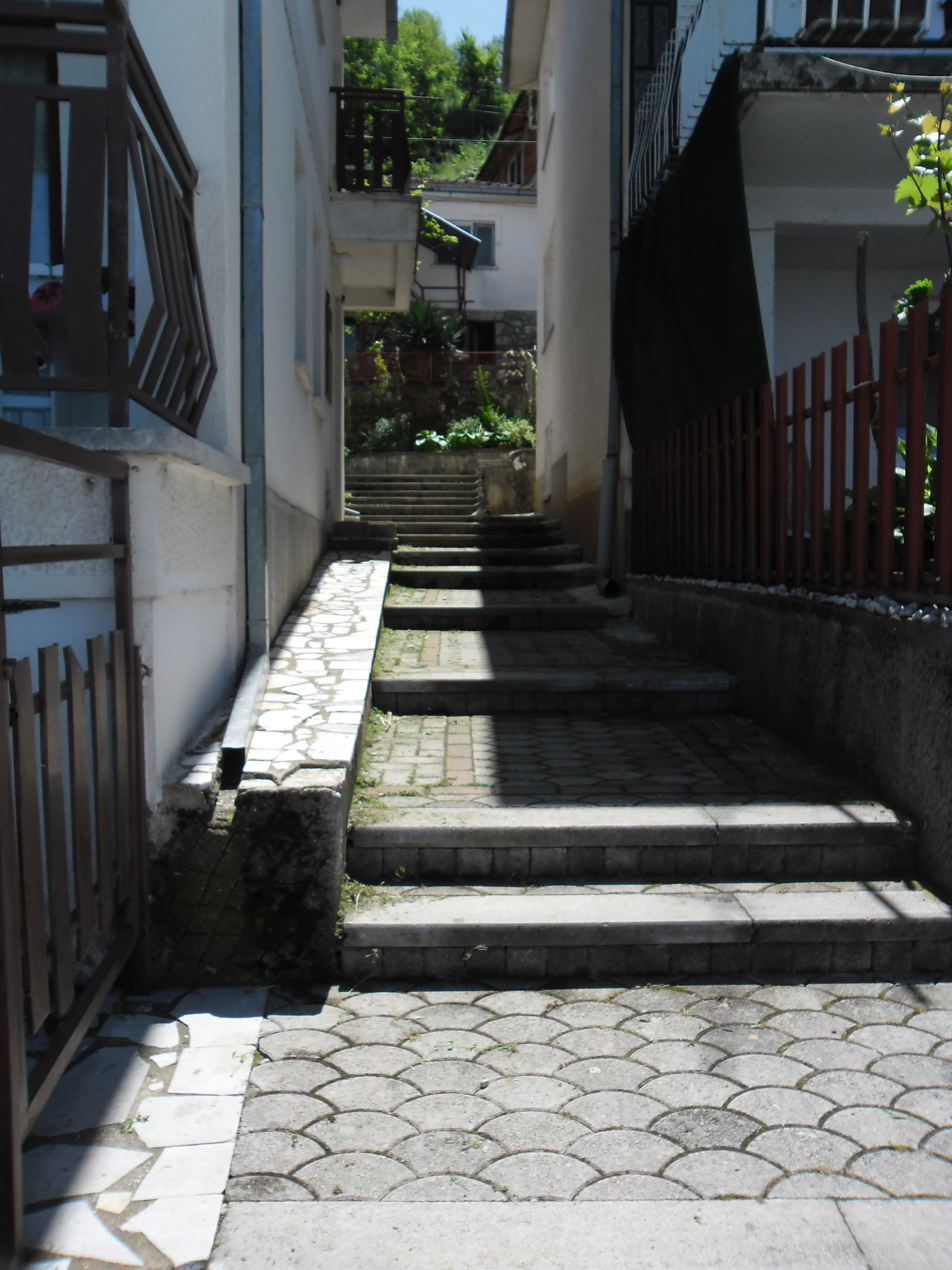
A typical street in Trpejca

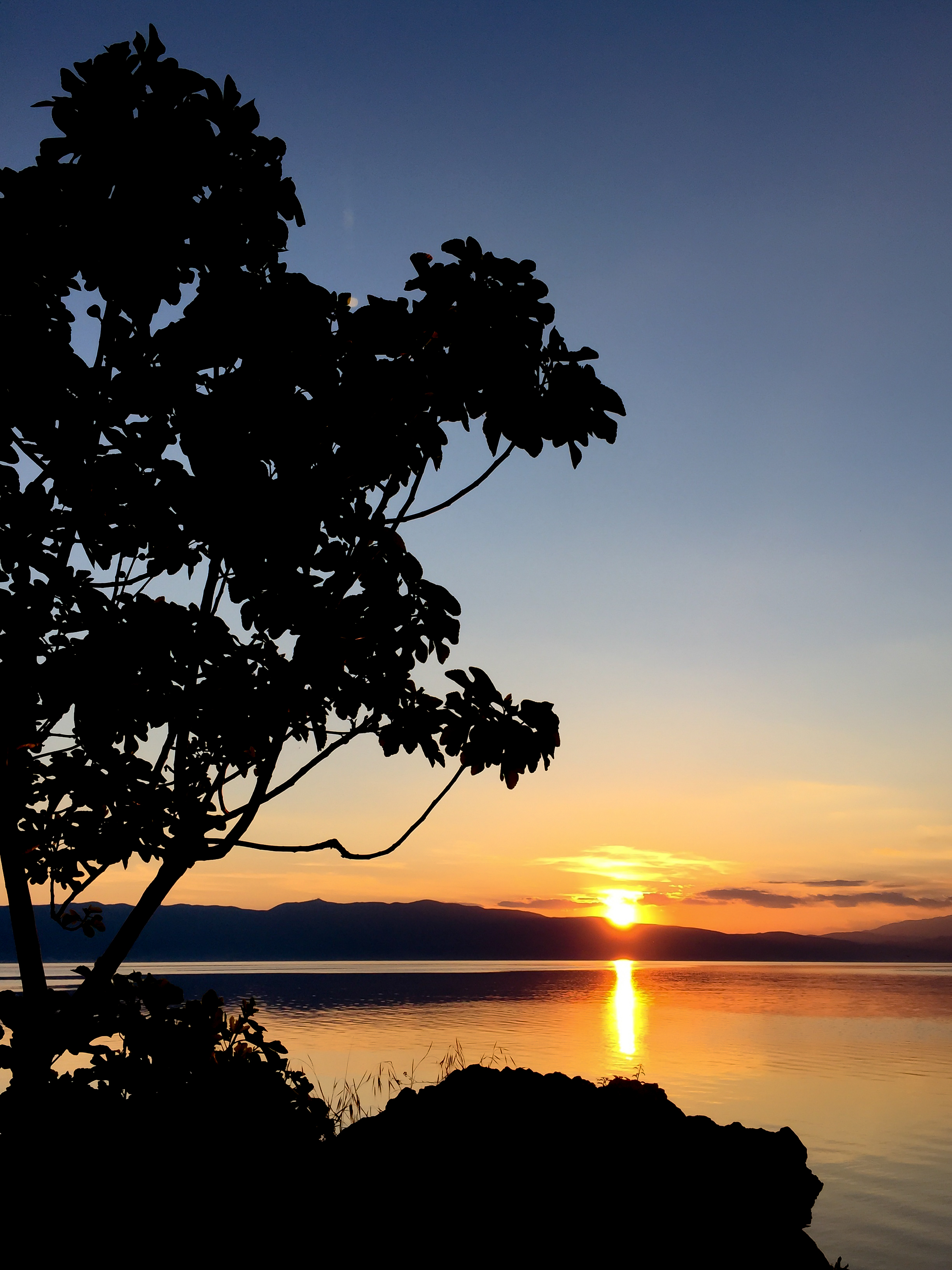
Sunset over Albania from Trpejca

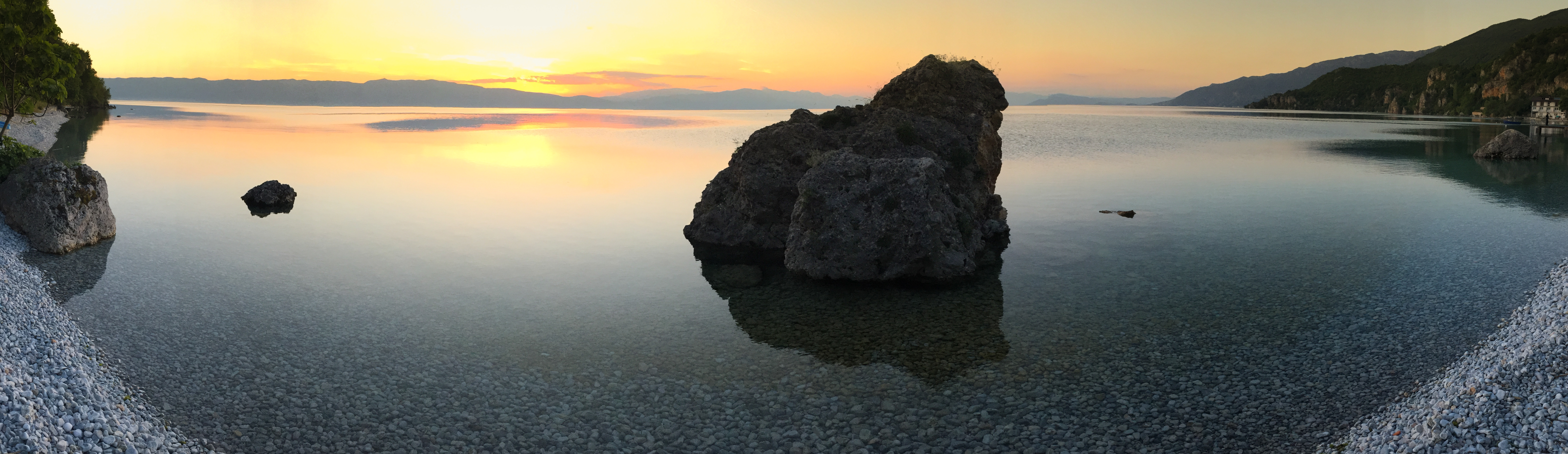
Sunset panorama from Trpejca

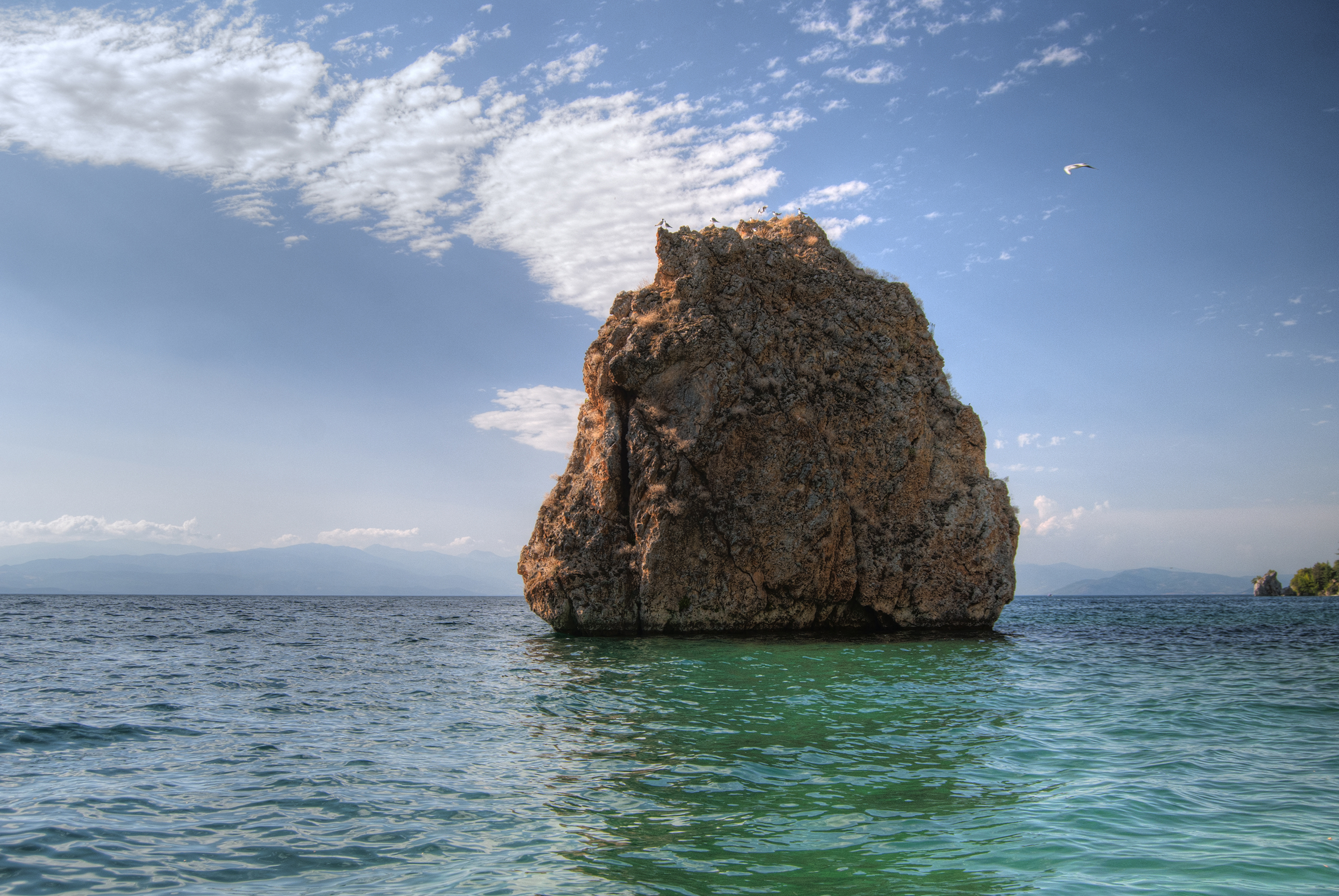
Trpejca stog

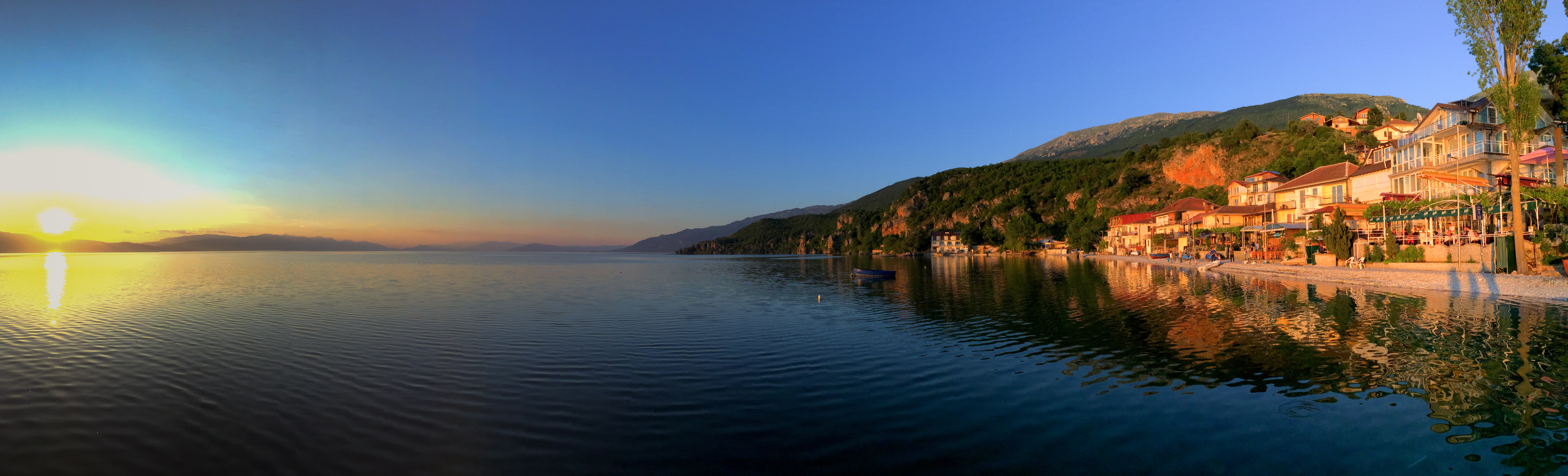
Trpejca and Lake Ohrid panorama
