= Zhaklina Peto =

Albanian lawyer and diplomat (born 1972)

Prof. Dr. Zhaklina Peto

Albanian Ambassador to Montenegro
- Incumbent
- Assumed office 10 July 2023
- President: Bajram Begaj
- Prime Minister: Edi Rama
- Preceded by: Ridi Kurtezi

Personal details
- Born: September 18, 1972 (age 53) Tirana, PR Albania
- Education: University of Tirana
- Occupation: Diplomat, academic

Zhaklina Peto (born September 18, 1972) is an Albanian lawyer and diplomat who has served as the Ambassador of Albania to Montenegro since July 2023. She was previously a professor at the Faculty of Law, University of Tirana, specializing in civil law, labor law, and social security law.

== Early life and education ==
Peto was born in Tirana, Albania. She completed her higher education at the University of Tirana, where she later obtained her doctorate and academic titles.

== Academic career ==
From 1996 until 2023, Peto was a professor at the Faculty of Law at the University of Tirana. Her research and teaching focused on employment law, social security, intellectual property, and civil law. She authored several textbooks and numerous academic publications.

During her tenure, she served in leadership roles, including:

- Member of the Scientific Council of the Faculty of Law
- Member of the Academic Senate of the University of Tirana
- Member of the Council of Professors
- Head of the Department of Civil Law

== Diplomatic career ==
In July 2023, Peto was appointed as Ambassador of Albania to Montenegro by President Bajram Begaj, succeeding Ridi Kurtezi.
