= Albania–North Macedonia border =

The Albania–North Macedonia border separates the Republic of Albania and North Macedonia in Southeast Europe. The border stretches for a total of 186.1 km (115.6 mi) and is situated along the southeastern edge of the country.

The border begins at the tripoint with Kosovo in the Bjeshka e Kokës mountains in the North and stretches to the tripoint with Greece in Lake Prespa in the South.

== Border crossings ==
(Albania) Albanian checkpoint	Municipality	(North Macedonia) North Macedonian checkpoint	Municipality	Opening times	Route in Albania	Route in North Macedonia
Bllatë e Sipërme	Dibër	Blato	Debar		SH-44	P-1202
Trebisht	Bulqizë	Džepište	Debar		local road	local road
Qafë Thanë	Prrenjas	Kjafasan	Struga			
Tushemisht	Pogradec	Sveti Naum	Ohrid			P-501
Goricë	Pustec	Stenje	Resen		SH-79	R-1307
