= Ljubaništa =

Village in the municipality of Ohrid, North Macedonia

Ljubaništa Љубаништа
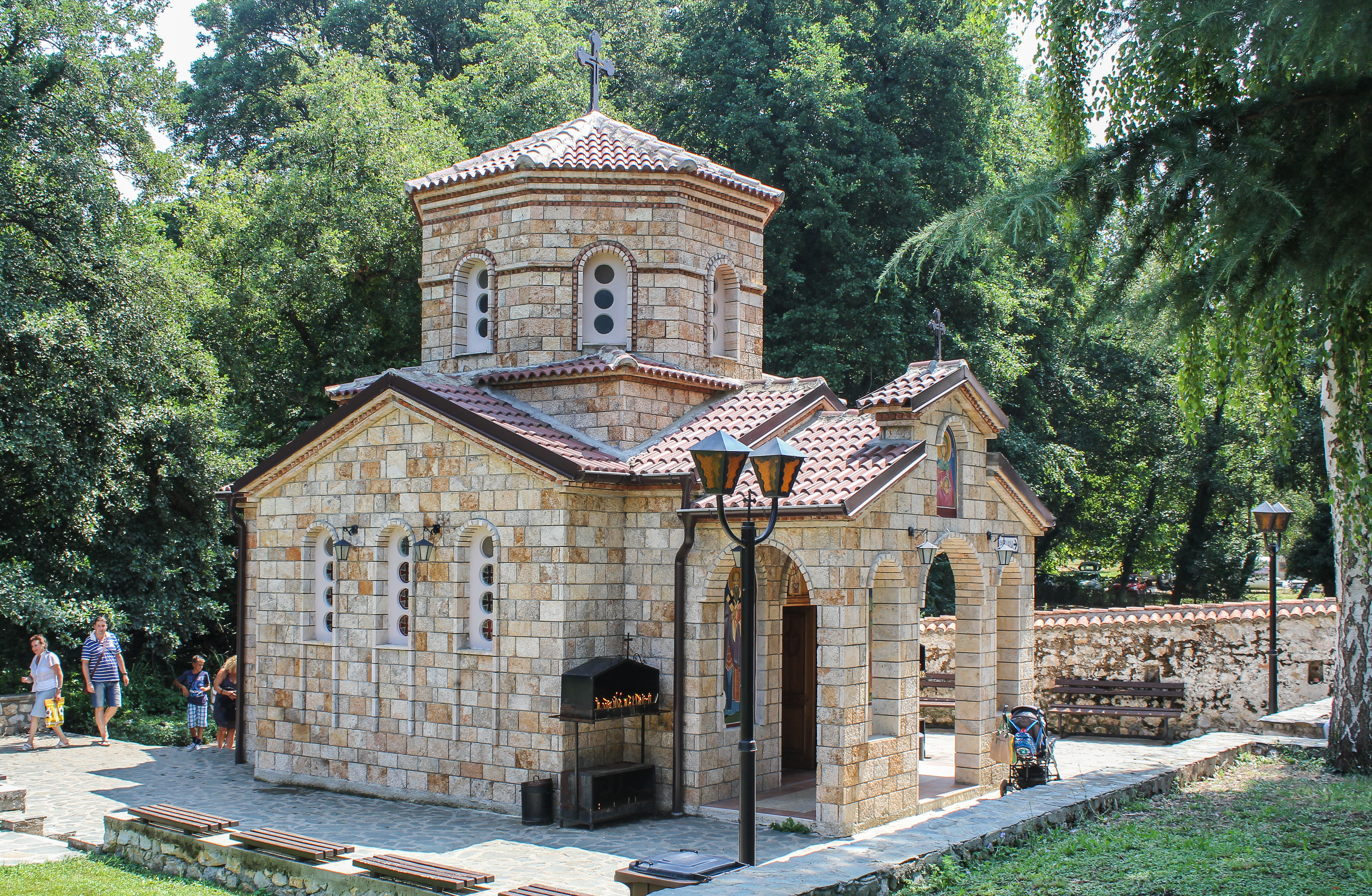
- St. Petka Church

- Location within North Macedonia
- Coordinates: 40°55′0″N 20°47′0″E
- Country: North Macedonia
- Region: Southwestern
- Municipality: Ohrid

Population (2002)
  - Total: 171
- Time zone: UTC+1 (CET)

Ljubaništa (Macedonian: Љубаништа) is a village along the shore of the Lake Ohrid in North Macedonia. The village is located near the Monastery of St. Naum and the border with Albania.

== History ==
Of all the Orthodox Macedonian villages located on the eastern side of Lake Ohrid, only Ljubaništa had family ties with Orthodox Albanians from Pogradec and Korçë in Albania.

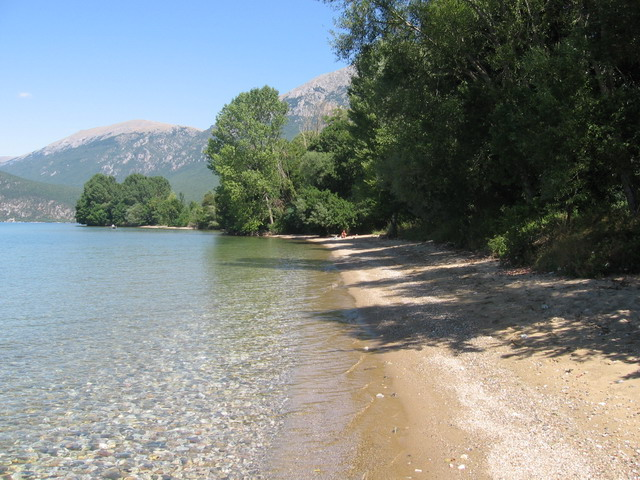
Beach in Ljubaništa

== Demographics ==
According to the 2002 census, the village had a total of 171 inhabitants. Ethnic groups in the village include:

- Macedonians 169
- Turks 1
- Others 1
