= Albania–Montenegro border =

International border

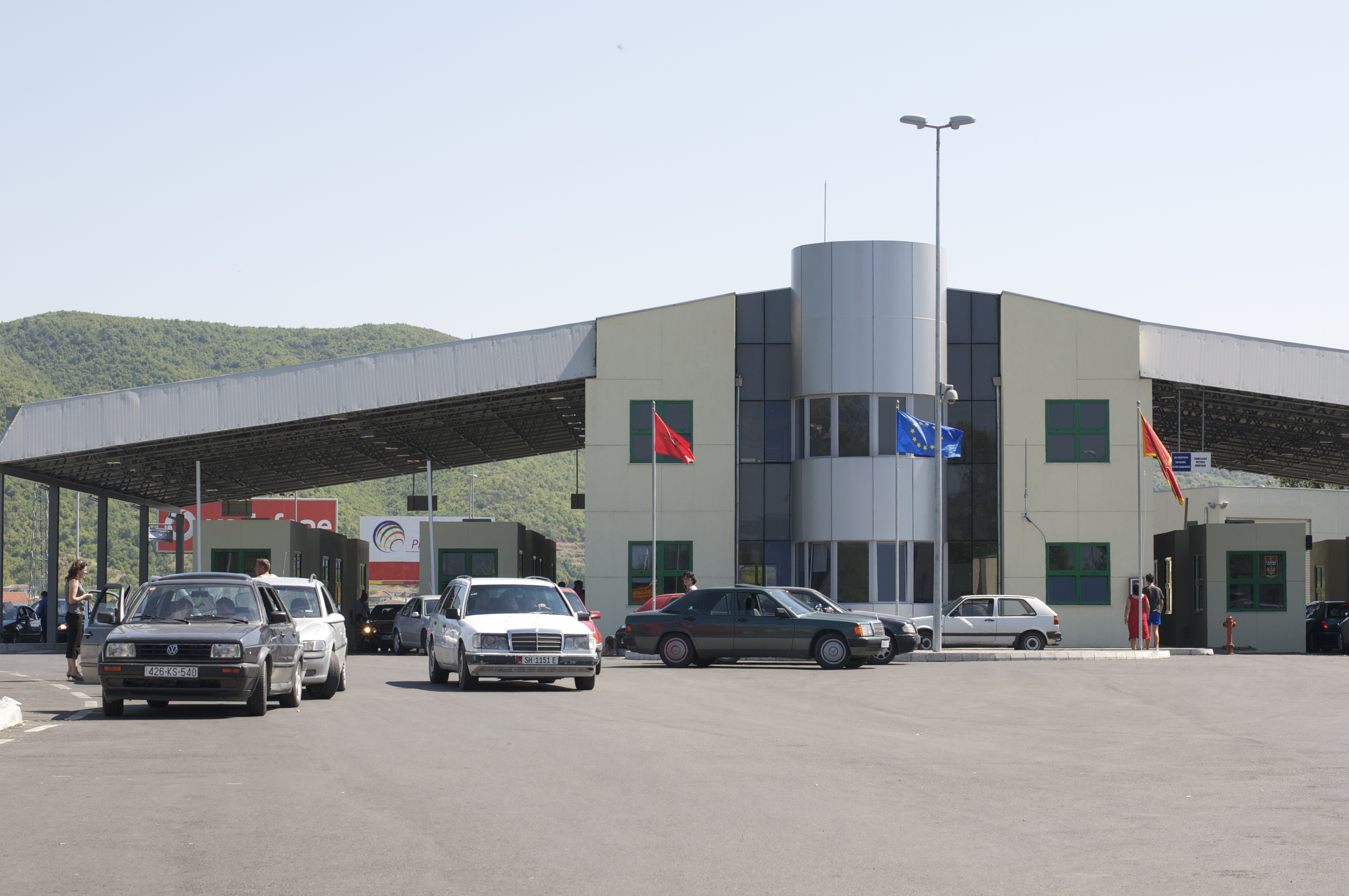
Muriqan-Sukobin integrated crossing between Albania and Montenegro

The Albania–Montenegro border separates the Republic of Albania and Montenegro in Southeast Europe, it has a length of 186 km (116 mi). At its southern end lies the Adriatic Sea, while its northeastern end terminates at the triple point with Kosovo (although this is contested by Serbia). The border passes through Lake Skadar, the largest lake in the Balkan Peninsula.

== Economic migration ==
The border between Albania and Montenegro is viewed by many economic migrants as a route into the prosperous economies of Central and Western Europe.

In 2018 entrepreneurial smugglers began to offer a new route into the European Union, running from Greece through Albania, Montenegro and Bosnia to Croatia, a member state of the European Union. About 11,000 migrants from Asia and North Africa took this route and registered their arrival within the European Union in Bosnia in the first half of 2018, compared with 755 migrant arrivals in 2017.

=== Troop deployment ===
On 11 July 2018, Montenegro announced that it was deploying regular army troops along the border to stop illegal migrants from entering the country at the Bozaj crossing from Albania, 12 kilometres (7.5 mi) from the Montenegrin city of Podgorica.

=== Barrier ===
A border fence to block illegal entrants from crossing the border from Albania into Montenegro was proposed in May 2018. In June, Hungary offered to supply 23 kilometres (14 mi) of razor-wire fencing to Montenegro. Montenegrin Prime Minister Dusko Markovic denied that his country was considering building a border fence in early July. On 24 July 2018, Hungarian Prime Minister Viktor Orbán met with Markovic and offered to help Montenegro to build a 25 kilometres (16 mi) long fence along the border. Markovic thanked Orban for his offer, but responded that "For now, there are no reasons for that."

Vojislav Dragovic, who is Head of the Border Department, has stated that a fence may be necessary because Albanian authorities have failed to abide by the bilateral readmission agreement that obliges them to admit migrants turned back by Montenegro.

== Albanian community in Montenegro ==
Montenegro is also said to be concerned about recent growth of the small Albanian community in Montenegro.

== Crossings ==
These are the border crossings between the two countries (listed from West to East)

(Albania) Albanian checkpoint	Municipality	(Montenegro) Montenegrin checkpoint	Municipality	Opened	Route in Albania	Route in Montenegro	Status
Muriqan	Shkodër	Sukobin	Ulcinj	2009			Open
Zogaj	Shkodër	Skla	Bar	Planned	local road	local road	Planned
Han i Hotit	Malësi e Madhe	Božaj	Tuzi	?			Open
Shkodër	Shkodër	Podgorica	Podgorica	1986	Podgorica–Shkodër railway		Open
Vermosh	Malësi e Madhe	Grnčar	Gusinje	2021	SH 20 (Albania)	P-9	Open
Grabom	Malësi e Madhe	Cijevna	Tuzi	2021	local road	local road	Open
Qafë Vranicë	Tropojë	Hoti	Plav	Planned	local road	local road	Planned

== See also ==
- Albania–Montenegro relations
