= Albania–Kosovo border =

The Albania–Kosovo border separates the Republic of Albania and Kosovo in Southeast Europe. The border stretches for a total of 116.3 km (72.3 mi) and is situated along the southwestern edge of the country. This border is significantly marked by the Albanian Alps, the Koritnik and Gjallica Mountains, which occupy the vast expanse of land between the countries.

The border begins at the tripoint with Montenegro near Dobërdoll in the North and stretches to the tripoint with North Macedonia near Çajë.

== Border crossings ==
(Albania) Albanian checkpoint	Municipality	Kosovo checkpoint	District	Opening times	Route in Albania	Route in Kosovo
Qafë Morinë	Kukës	Morinë/Morina	Gjakova			9-1
Qafa e Prushit	Has	Qafa e Prushit	Gjakova		SH-23	R-203
Dobrunë	Has	Blinishtë/Lipovec	Gjakova		local road	local road
Morinë	Kukës	Vërmica/Vrbnica	Prizren			M-25
Pakisht	Kukës	Kërstec/Donji Krstac	Prizren		local road	local road
Orgjost	Kukës	Orqushë/Orčuša	Prizren		local road	local road
Borje	Kukës	Glloboqicë/Globočica	Prizren		local road	local road
Shishtavec	Kukës	Krushevë/Kruševo	Prizren		local road	local road
