= Bllatë e Sipërme =

- Village
- Location within Albania
- Coordinates: 41°33′46″N 20°29′22″E
- Country: Albania
- County: Dibër
- Municipality: Dibër
- Administrative unit: Maqellarë
- Time zone: UTC+1 (CET)
  - Summer (DST): UTC+2 (CEST)

Bllatë e Sipërme (Upper Bllatë) is a settlement in the former Maqellarë municipality, Dibër County, northeastern Albania. At the 2015 local government reform it became part of the municipality Dibër In this village a border crossing point with Macedonia is situated.
