= General Directorate of Customs (Albania) =

Government agency of Albania

General Directorate of Customs Drejtoria e Përgjithshme e Doganave
- Logo

Jurisdictional structure
- Operations jurisdiction: Albania
- Specialist jurisdiction: Customs, excise, gambling

Operational structure
- Headquarters: Tirana
- Agency executive: Genti Gazheli, Director General

Website
- www.dogana.gov.al

The General Directorate of Customs (DPD; Albanian: Drejtoria e Përgjithshme e Doganave) is the government agency responsible for the inspection and transferring of imported and exported goods in and out of Albania.

The mission of the Customs administration is to safeguard the economic and financial interests of the State. It has the duty to guarantee the security and protection of business goods by relying on risk management and efficient controls, facilitating trade by implementing modern working methods and technology.
