= Sukobin =

Sukobin Сукобин Sukubinë
- Village
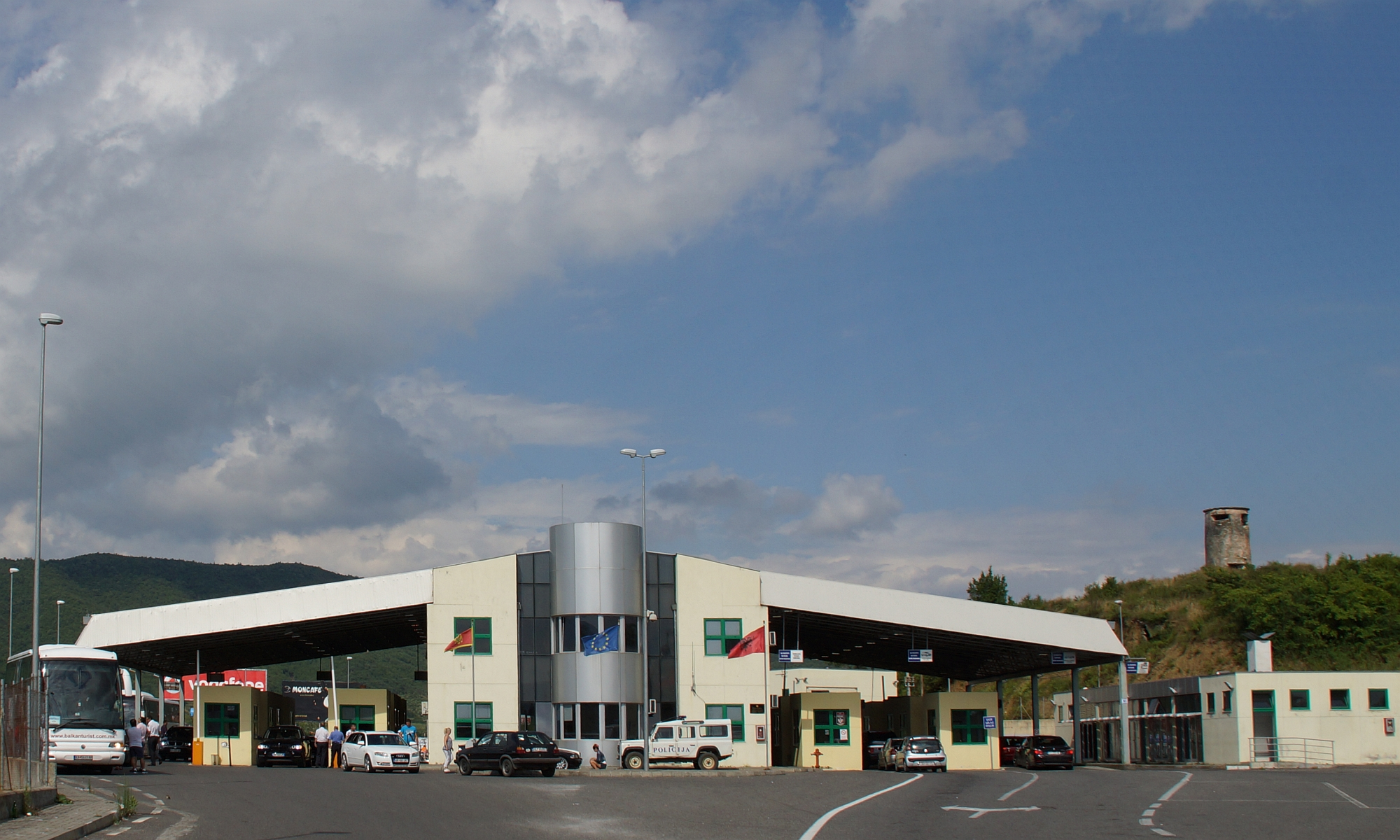
- Albania-Montenegro border in Sukobin

- Location within Montenegro
- Coordinates: 42.011797°N 19.362545°E
- Country: Montenegro
- Region: Coastal
- Municipality: Ulcinj

Population (2011)
  - Total: 367
- Time zone: UTC+1 (CET)
  - Summer (DST): UTC+2 (CEST)

Sukobin (Montenegrin Cyrillic: Сукобин; Albanian: Sukubinë) is a village in the municipality of Ulcinj, Montenegro. It is located at the Albania–Montenegro border. Albin Kurti’s father Zaim Kurti and his paternal family come from the area of Sukobin.

== Demographics ==
According to the 2011 census, its population was 367, all but 3 of them Albanians.
