= Mavrommati =

Mavrommati or Mavromati (Greek: Μαυρομμάτι) is a village in the Karditsa regional unit of Thessaly, Greece It is known for its local community and is part of the Karditsa municipality. The village is involved in various agricultural activities typical of the region.

In the village of Mavrommati. The agricultural activities in this area typically include the cultivation of various crops and the raising of Livestock. Common crops grown in the region include Olive, Grain, Vegetable, and Fruit. Livestock farming, particularly for sheep and goats, is also significant. The region's mountainous terrain influences the types of agriculture practiced, with a focus on crops and animals that can thrive in such conditions.

== Places in Greece ==
- Mavrommati, Boeotia, a village in the municipal unit of Thespies, Boeotia
- Mavrommati, Karditsa, a village in the municipal unit of Mouzaki, Karditsa regional unit
- Mavrommati, Ithomi, a village in the municipal unit of Ithomi, Messenia
- Mavrommati, Messini, a village in the municipal unit of Messini, Messenia
- Mavrommati, Rhodope, a village in the municipal unit of Neo Sidirochori, Rhodope regional unit
- Mavromati, another name for Agios Thomas, Boeotia

== People ==
- Oleg Mavromati, Russian filmmaker
- Athina Mavrommati, Greek actress who played in An itan to violi pouli
