= Albania–Montenegro relations =

- Albania: Montenegro

Albania–Montenegro relations are the bilateral relations between Albania and Montenegro. Relations between the two countries have been described as "very good." Albania has an embassy in Podgorica. Montenegro has an embassy in Tirana. Both countries are full members of the Council of Europe, the Organization for Security and Co-operation in Europe (OSCE), the Central European Free Trade Agreement (CEFTA), and NATO.

== History ==
During the Balkan Wars, Montenegro aligned with Serbia against Albania. Montenegro engaged in the Siege of Scutari, which resulted in the conquest of Shkodër. While Shkodër was returned to Albania in May 1913, Montenegro was allowed to keep other territory conquered from Albania. Montenegrin territory which used to be part of Albania includes the city of Plav, as well as the country's eastern coast, bordering Lake Skadar.

Following the creation of Kingdom of Yugoslavia, Montenegro ceased to be an independent country. From 1918 through 2006, Montenegro's international relations were handled by the central government of Yugoslavia. However, during the Kosovo War, the Republic of Montenegro preserved ties with Albania by taking a stance against Slobodan Milošević. This included the country taking in ethnic Albanian refugees fleeing from Kosovo.

Following Montenegrin independence in 2006, Albanian and Montenegrin relations were restored. Albania officially recognized Montenegrin independence on 12 July, 2006, a month and a half after independence was declared. Diplomatic relations between the two countries were officially established on 1 August, 2006.

In 2013, Igor Lukšić and Edmond Panariti, foreign ministers of Montenegro and Albania, respectively, met in Tirana to further strengthen ties between the two countries. Results of this meeting also included political, economic, and military cooperation.

A factor in modern relations between the two countries is the presence of ethnic Albanians in Montenegro, which make up 4.99% of the population. Five seats in the Parliament of Montenegro are set aside for ethnic Albanians.

== International organizations ==
Both countries are the EU candidate countries. Albania joined NATO in 2009, and Montenegro joined in 2017.

== Resident diplomatic missions ==
- Albania has an embassy in Podgorica.
- Montenegro has an embassy in Tirana.

== See also ==
- Foreign relations of Albania
- Foreign relations of Montenegro
- Accession of Albania to the EU
- Accession of Montenegro to the EU
- Albanians in Montenegro
- Serbo-Montenegrins in Albania
- Albania–Montenegro border
- Albania–Yugoslavia relations
