= Sopik, Dropull =

Sopik Σωπική
- Village
- Location within Albania
- Coordinates: 40°5′10″N 20°24′46″E
- Country: Albania
- County: Gjirokastër
- Municipality: Dropull
- Administrative unit: Pogon
- Time zone: UTC+1 (CET)
  - Summer (DST): UTC+2 (CEST)
- Postal Code: 6007

Sopik (Albanian definite form: Sopiku, Greek: Σωπική) is a settlement in Gjirokastër County, southeastern Albania. It is part of the former commune of Pogon. After the 2015 local government reform, it became part of the municipality of Dropull. A secondary border crossing point with Greece is situated near Sopik.

== Name ==
The toponym Sopik is derived from either the Bulgarian word сoп, sop meaning 'hill, elevation' or the Serbian word сoп, sop meaning 'waterfall' with the suffix ик, ik.

== Demographics ==
Sopik is a Greek speaking village. Inhabitants are Christians and the population was 499 in 1992. According to a 2014 report by the Albanian government, there were 670 Greeks in the village. Inhabitants who migrated from Sopik went to Athens in Greece.
