= Tre Urat =

- Location within Albania
- Traversed by: SH80

Third Approach
- Location: Albania / Greece
- Range: Border crossings of Albania
- Coordinates: 40°4′28″N 20°36′4″E

Tre Urat or Three Bridges is a location in southeastern Albania where a border crossing point between Albania and Greece is situated.
