= Rips, Sarandë =

Location in Albania

Rips
- Location within Albania

Third Approach
- Location: Albania / Greece
- Range: Border crossings of Albania
- Coordinates: 39°45′19″N 20°17′21″E

Rips is a location in the southeastern part of Albania where a secondary border crossing point between Albania and Greece is situated.
