= Qafë Vranicë =

- Location within Albania
- Interactive map of Qafë Vranicë

Third Approach
- Location: Albania–Montenegro border
- Range: List of mountains in Albania
- Coordinates: 42°30′47″N 19°59′3″E

Qafë e Vranicës is a mountain pass through the Albanian mountains along the border between Albania and Montenegro. A new border crossing point between the two countries is planned to be open at the pass.
