= Qafë Botë =

- Location within Albania
- Interactive map of Qafë Botë
- Traversed by: SH97

Third Approach
- Location: Albania–Greece border
- Range: List of mountains in Albania
- Coordinates: 39°39′14″N 20°9′31″E

Qafë Botë is a mountain pass through the Albanian mountains along the border between Albania and Greece. In this place is situated a border crossing point between the two countries.
