= Monastery of Saint Naum =

Macedonian Orthodox Monastery

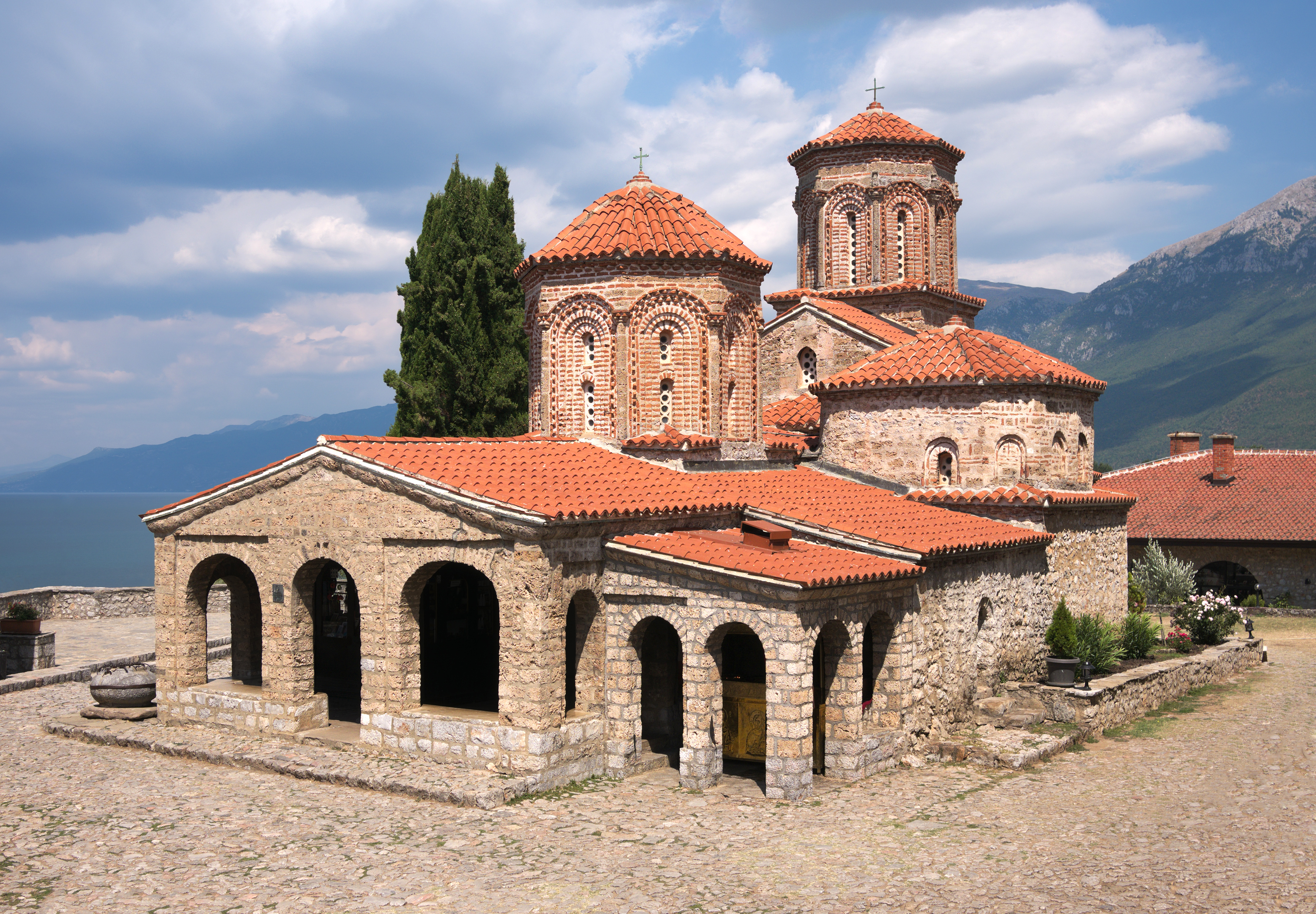
- Monastery of Saint Naum

- Location within North Macedonia

Monastery information
- Order: Macedonian Orthodox
- Established: 905
- Diocese: Diocese of Debar and Kičevo

People
- Founder: Saint Naum

Site
- Location: Ohrid Municipality
- Coordinates: 40°54′50″N 20°44′25.8″E
- Public access: yes

The Monastery of Saint Naum (Macedonian: Манастир „Свети Наум“) is a Macedonian Orthodox monastery. It is named after the medieval Bulgarian writer and enlightener Saint Naum who founded it. The monastery is situated in North Macedonia, along Lake Ohrid, 29 kilometres (18 mi) south of the city of Ohrid, within the boundary of the village of Ljubaništa.

The Lake Ohrid area, including St Naum, is one of the most popular tourist destinations in North Macedonia.

== History ==
The monastery was established in 905 by St Naum of Ohrid himself. St Naum was also buried in the church and was subsequently canonized, becoming one of the first Bulgarian saints.

Since the 16th century, a Greek school had functioned in the monastery. The monastery had close ties with the printing house of Moscopole, a former prosperous city now in Albania. The area where the monastery of St Naum lies belonged to Albania from 1912 until June 28, 1925, when President Ahmed Zogu gifted it to the Kingdom of Yugoslavia as a result of negotiations between Albania and Yugoslavia and as a gesture of goodwill.

== In the arts ==
Rebecca West devoted a chapter of Black Lamb and Grey Falcon to her visit to Sveti Naum, which occurred in 1937.

== Gallery ==
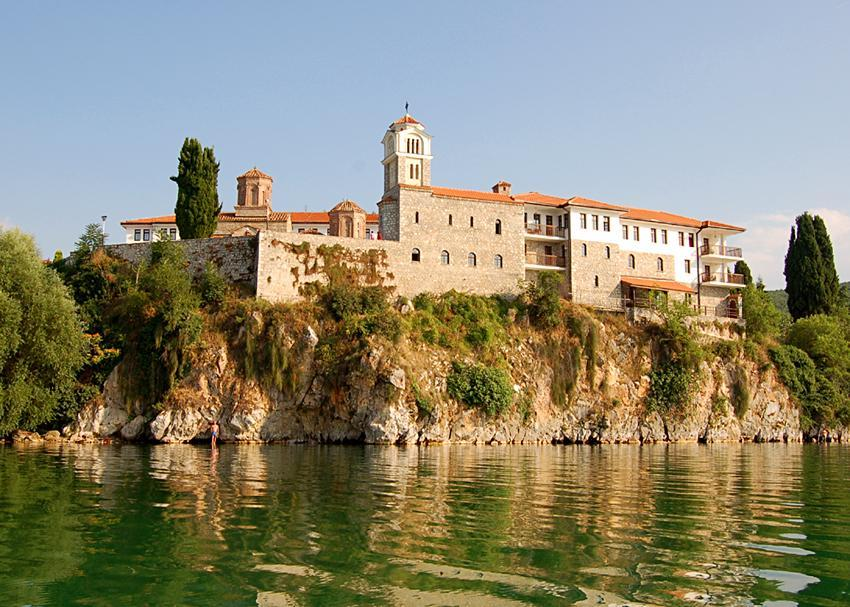
Exterior of Saint Naum Monastery from Lake Ohrid

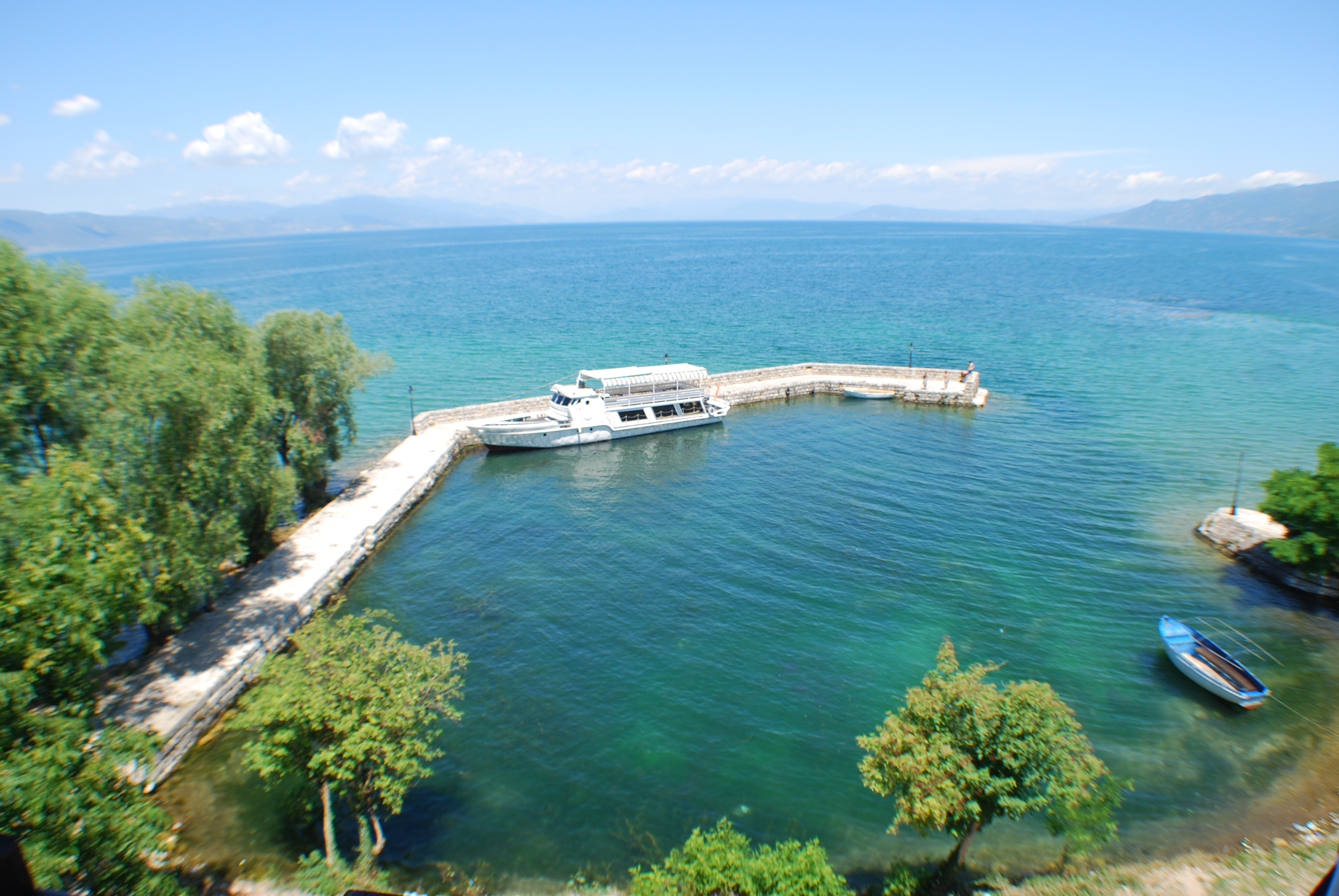
Lake Ohrid from the monastery

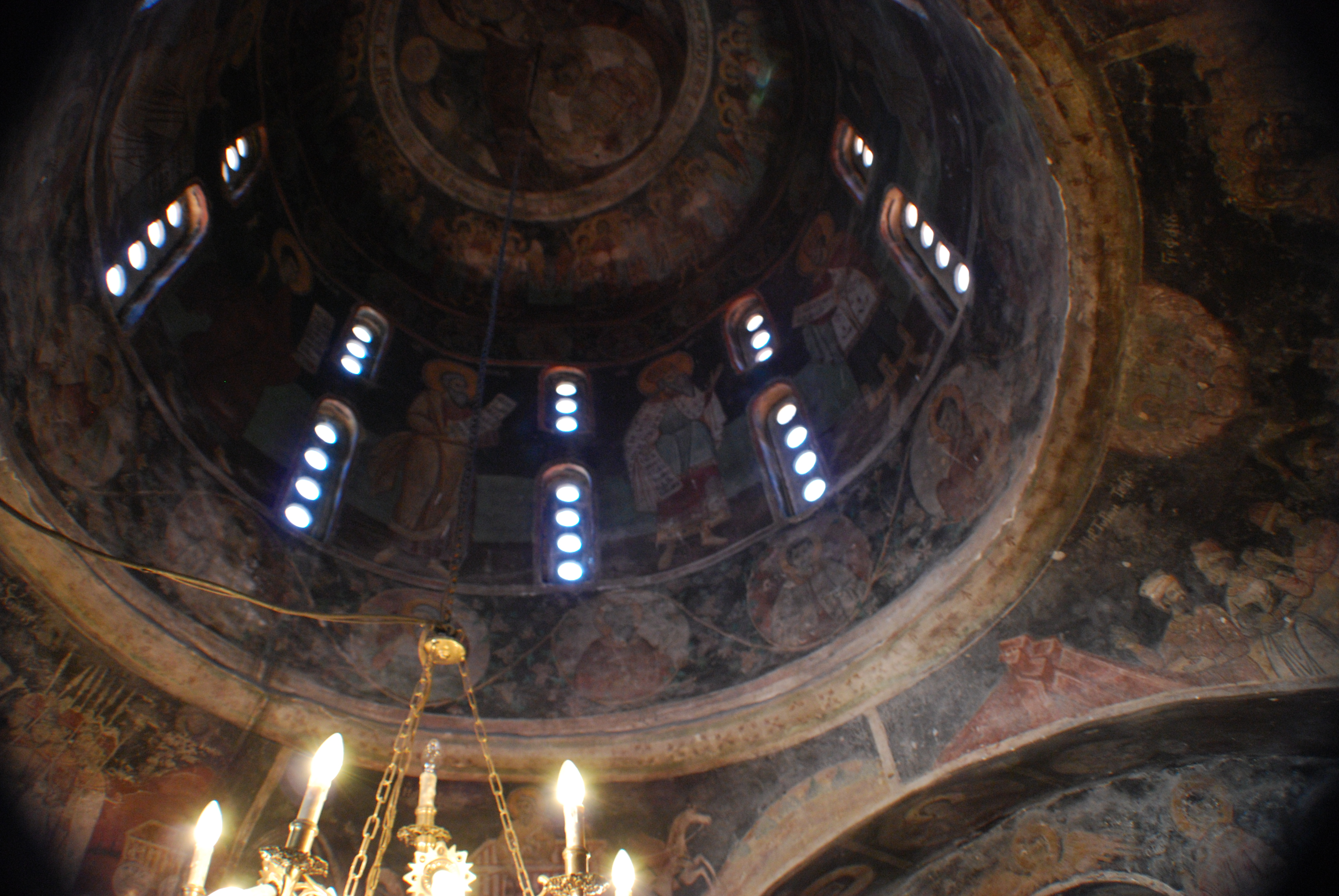
A dome inside

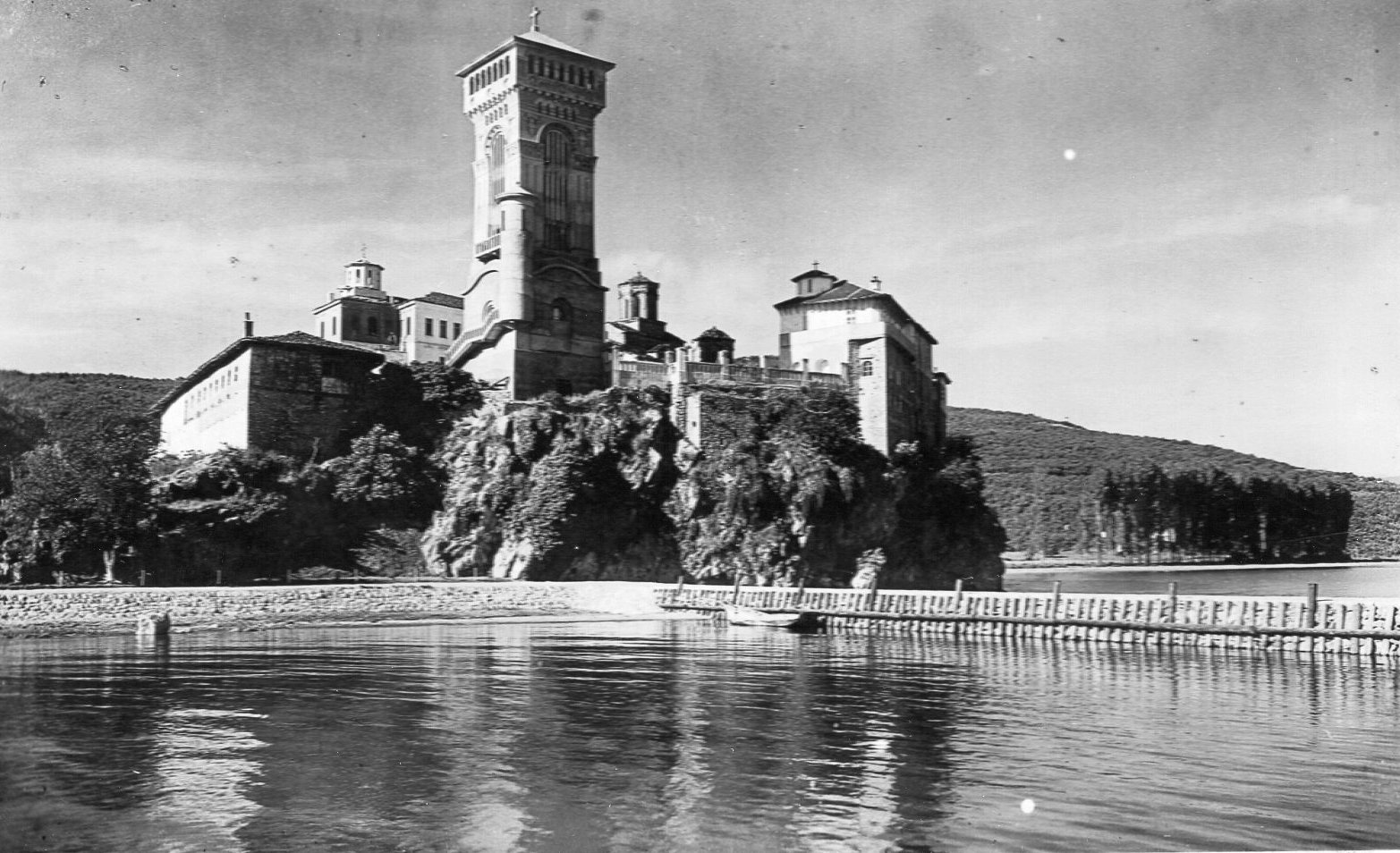
Postcard of Ohrid, Monastery of Saint Naum from 1934
