= Qafë Prush =

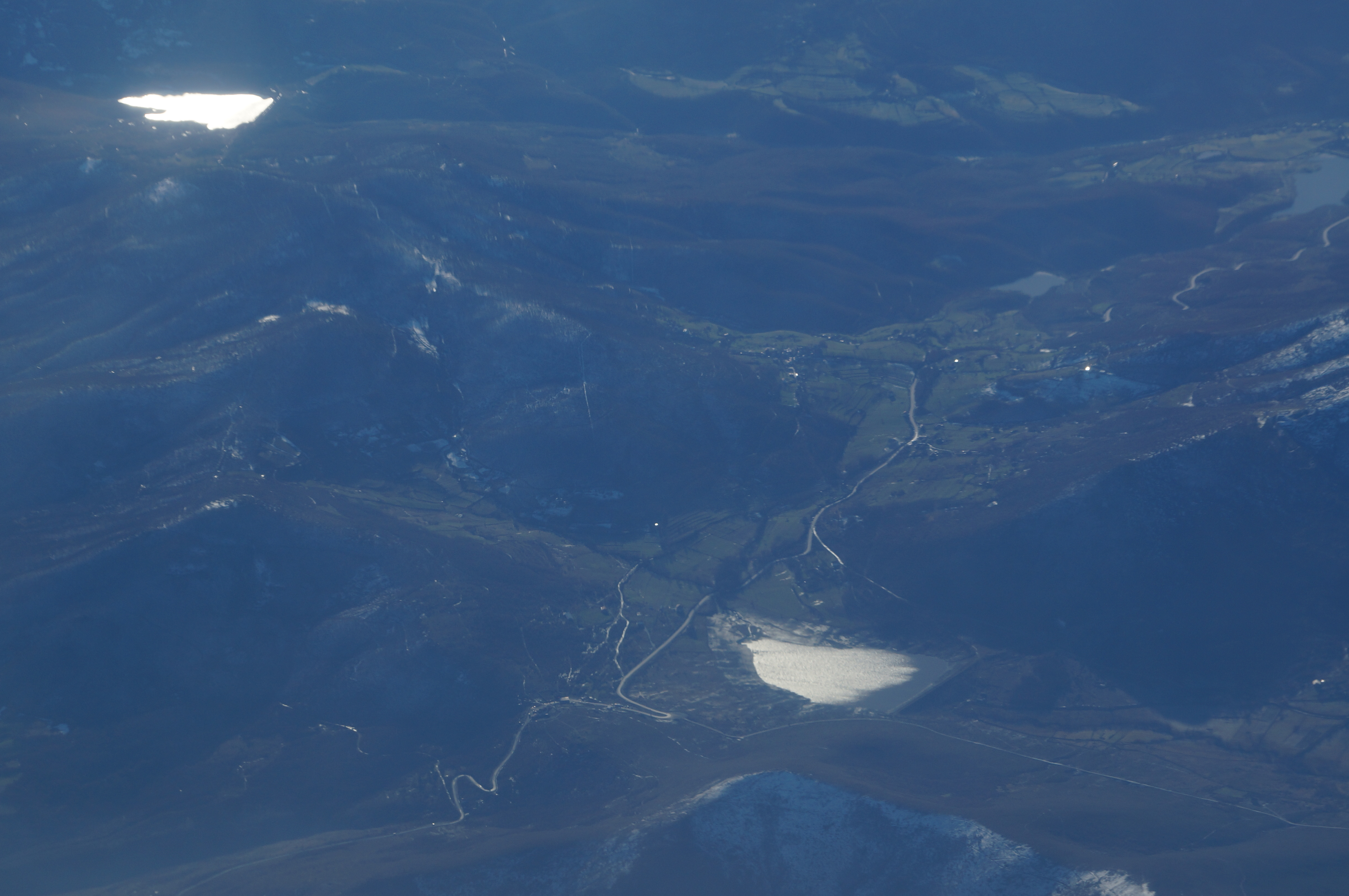
- Aerial view of December 2017

- Location within Albania
- Interactive map of Qafë Prush
- Traversed by: SH23

Third Approach
- Location: Albania–Kosovo border
- Range: List of mountains in Albania
- Coordinates: 42°18′52″N 20°22′57″E

Qafa e Prushit is a mountain pass through the Albanian mountains along the border between Albania and Kosovo. A border crossing point is present here.
