= Velmej =

Velmej Велмеј
- Village
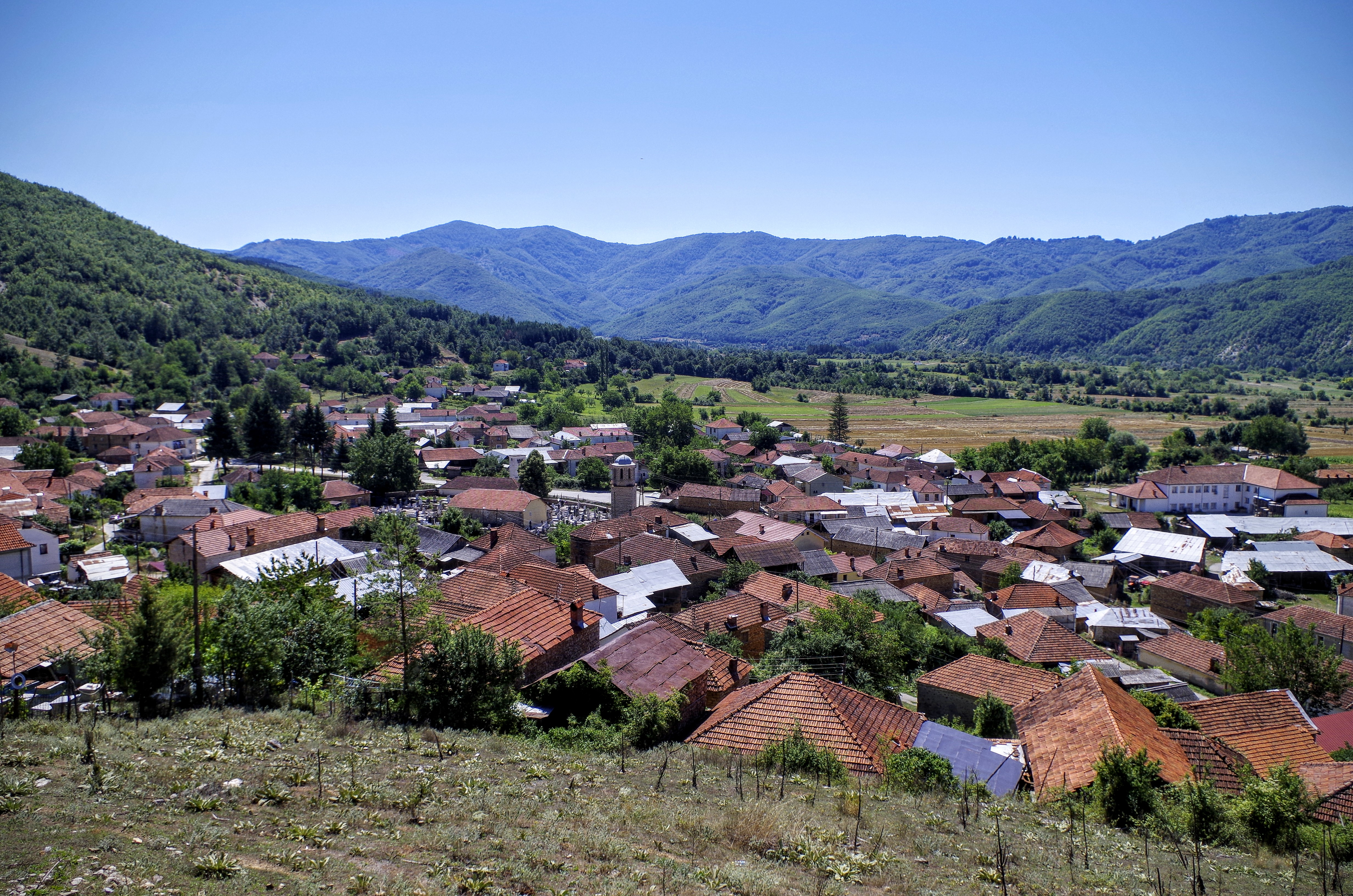
- Panoramic view of the village Velmej

- Location within North Macedonia
- Country: North Macedonia
- Region: Southwestern
- Municipality: Debarca

Population (2002)
  - Total: 511
- Time zone: UTC+1 (CET)
  - Summer (DST): UTC+2 (CEST)
- Website: .

Velmej (Macedonian: Велмеј) is a village in the municipality of Debarca, North Macedonia. It used to be part of the former municipality of Belčišta.

== Location ==
Velmej is located at Dolna Debarca region, 13 km. east from the Ohrid-Kicevo high road.

On the western slopes of mountain Ilinska Bigla, from the north and the east side, the village is surrounded with the mountain massifs of Ilinska Bigla, (to the east is Kilaec peakat 1068 m, to the north is Čuki at 1303 m) and in the west and south sides is the Velmej field.

The village's altitude is 860 m. The area of the village Velmej takes 39.3 km^{2} or 10% of the territory of Debarca.

The closest airport to Velmej is OHD-Ohrid, located 18.7 km southwest of Velmej. Other nearby airports include SKP-Skopje 95.0 km to the northeast and TIA-Tirana Rinas 99.7 km to the west.

Places near Velmej, Macedonia: 3.2 km to Grko Pole, 3.5 km to Sošani, 4.1 km to Lešani, 4.1 km to Gorno Sredoreče, 4.7 km to Dolno Sredoreče, 6.3 km to Kuratica, 5.4 km to Ozdoleni, 6.3 km to Slatino, 5.8 km to Brežani, 6.0 km to Belčišta, 6.2 km to Zlesti, 7.6 km to Izdeglavje, 8.5 km to Sirula, 10.1 km to Arbinovo, 10.7 km to Plakje.

== Communist resistance ==
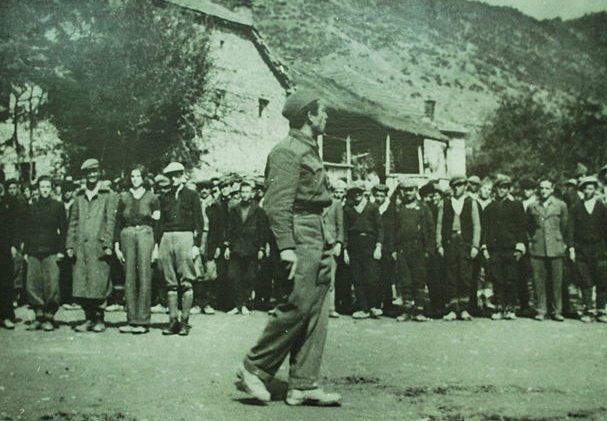
Petre Piruze - Majski, commander of the II operational zone, speaks to the fighters in Velmej, Debarca, 1944

During the Second World War in Yugoslav Macedonia, after the capitulation of Italy in 1943, Karaorman Mountain, about 30 km. from Ohrid, became the centre of partisan activity. A free territory was established by the Macedonian Partisans in that area, then part of the Kingdom of Albania. The first National Liberation Committees were set up in Debarca in the spring of 1943. The first schools with classes on the Macedonian language were opened in October and November 1943 in Velmej, Vrbjani, Belciste, Botun and other Ohrid villages.

== Demographics ==
According to the 2002 census, the village had a total of 511 inhabitants. Ethnic groups in the village include:

- Macedonians 511

== Economy ==
55.3% of the surface area of Velmej is forest and mountains, 22.4% is farmland, and 22.3% is in the moorland.

== Culture ==
In the Ohrid region there are several Neolithic settlements: Dolno Trnovo in Ohrid and Zlastrana in the village of Gorno Sredorece (Debarca), as well as the Kutlina site in the village of Velmej (Debarca), which dates back to the Eneolithic period.

At the centre of Velmej is a high bell tower of St. Nikolas Church. There is another church, St. George which looks down on northwards part of the village.

Also, an impressive fountain called ”Istok” (East) which disposes large amount of water running through 18 sources is situated at the western part of the village. That is the place where the traditional wedding ceremony called ”Bringing water by the bride” happens. Nowadays, there is a water system through the village, built in 1982, but “Istok” still brings together the inhabitants of Velmej.

Near the fountain is a tablet of fallen fighters of People's Liberation War and Ilinden rebellion.

== Notable people ==
- Zoran Stavreski - minister of finance of the Government Republic of Macedonia
- Ljube Trpeski - ex-governor of National Bank of the Republic of Macedonia
- Ilija Iloski - ex-Director of Customs Administration of the Republic of Macedonia, ex-member of Assembly of the Republic of Macedonia - Chief Operating Officer, Director of KMB - Komercijalna Banka Skopje
