= Italian occupation zone in the Balkans (1941–1943) =

Italian territories in the Balkans in WW2

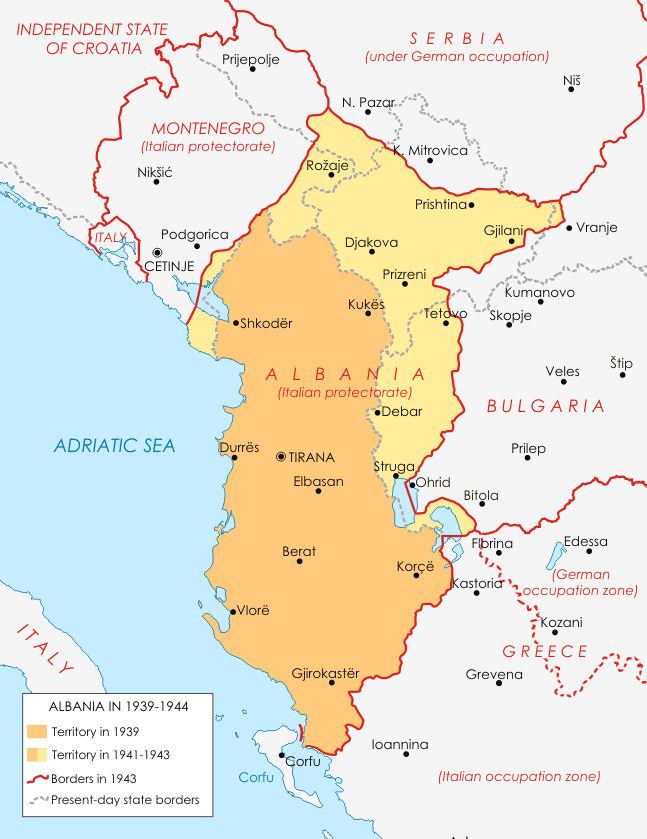
The Italian occupation zone in Albania, Kosovo, Macedonia and Montenegro during the Second World War from 1941 to 1943.

An Italian occupation zone was established in the Balkans during the Second World War during negotiations between Fascist Italy and Nazi Germany in Vienna in April 1941.

== The invasion of Greece ==
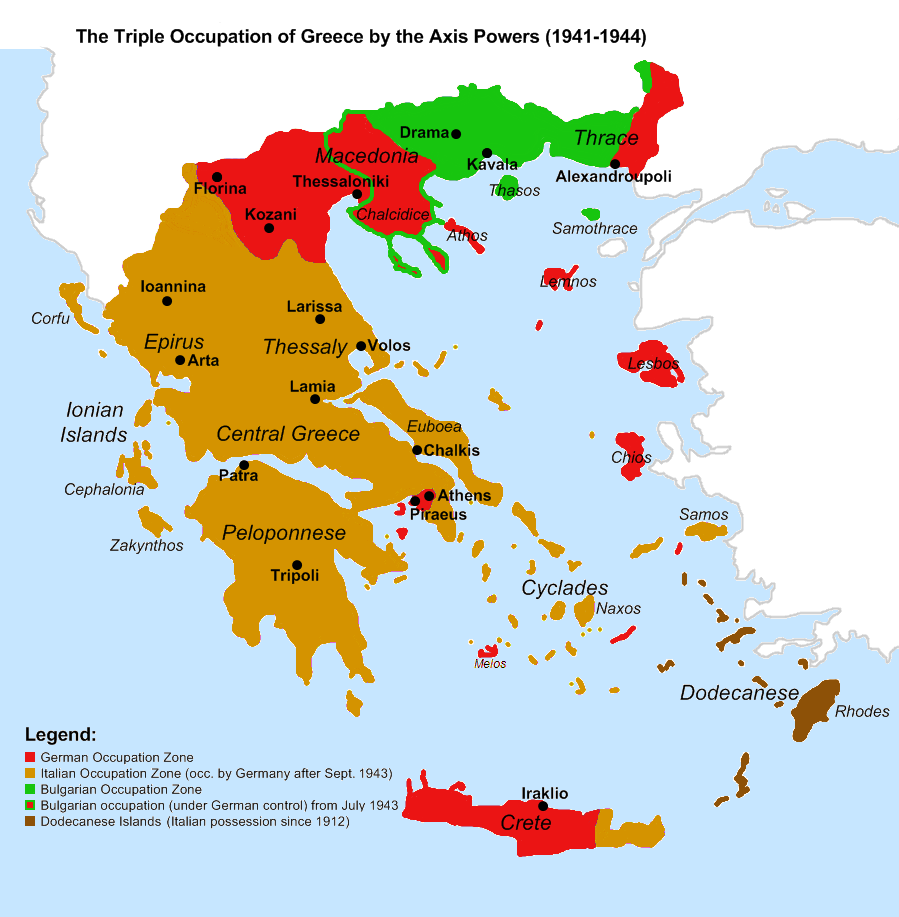
The Italian occupation zone in Greece during the Second World War.

On 7 April 1939, Italian troops invaded Albania and quickly occupied it. The campaign was part of the ambitions of the Fascist leader Benito Mussolini to build an Italian Empire. After occupying Albania in 1939, Mussolini used the territory as a launchpad to invade Greece on October 28, 1940, aiming to annex Epirus.

On 28 October 1940, the Greco-Italian War broke out. Initially, the Italian army made gains, advancing into Greek territory, but the Italians were subsequently defeated and driven back, with hostilities shifting to Albanian territory.Yugoslavia originally sided with the Axis powers, signing the Tripartite Pact on 25 March 1941, though it was short-lived as a coup overthrew the pro-Axis regime. This forced Hitler to intervene on the side of his ally Mussolini. The Axis forces’ military operation against Greece took place simultaneously with that against Yugoslavia and began on 6 April 1941. Overwhelmed by the numerically superior and better-equipped Nazi forces, Yugoslavia surrendered on 17 April, whilst Greece put up effective resistance until 27 April with the help of British troops.

== Vienna Line ==
The Italian occupation zone in Yugoslavia during the Second World War.

Following the successful conduct of the joint military operations (known respectively as Aufmarsch 25 and Marita) on 21–24 April 1941, a meeting took place in Vienna between Ribbentrop and Galeazzo Ciano. At this meeting, the so-called ‘Vienna Protocol’ was signed, establishing a demarcation line that became known as the ‘Vienna Line’ and delineating the Italian zone in the Balkans. The occupation zone in Yugoslavia included, in the north, large parts of the territory of Slovenia and Croatia. Italy was also granted occupation of Montenegro, Albania and almost the entirety of Kosovo. It was also granted part of Western Macedonia, including the towns of Tetovo, Struga, Debar, Kičevo and Gostivar, together with several villages south of Ohrid, with the aim of creating ‘Greater Albania’ . According to the ‘Vienna Protocol’, Italy was also granted the right to occupy vast areas of Greece – South-Western Macedonia (the districts of Paionia and Edessa, parts of Florina and Veria, Kastoria and part of Kozani), as well as Epirus, Thessaly, the Peloponnese, Euboea and the islands of the Cyclades archipelago.

== Аdministration and issues in the area ==
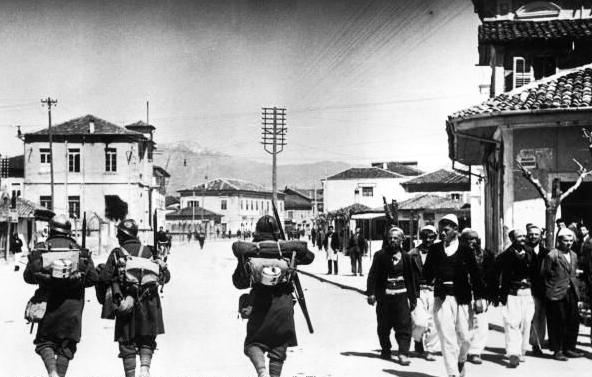
Italian soldiers entered Durrës in April 1939.

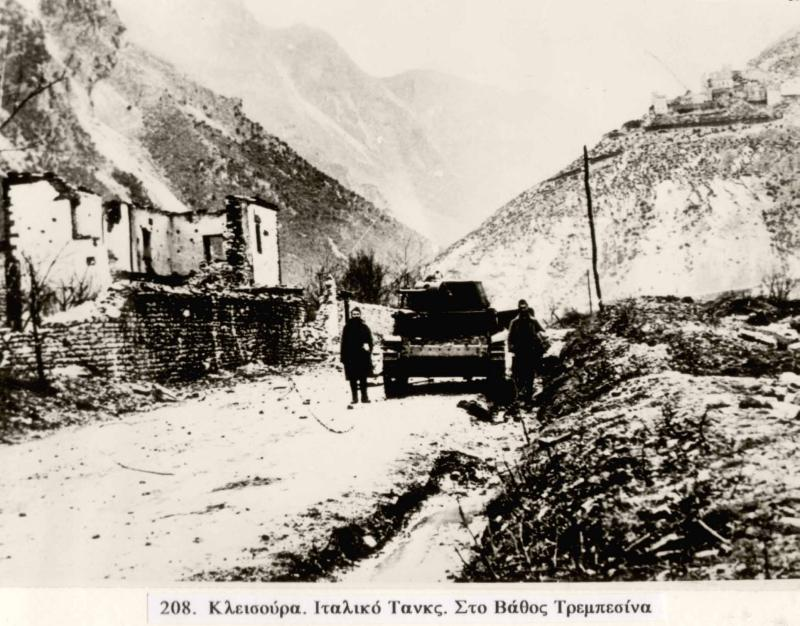
An Italian tank destroyed near Këlcyrë in the winter of 1941 during the Italo-Greek War.

Following the negotiations, Italy had an army of half a million men in the Balkans. The country began to feel cheated because it had not achieved the full extent of its objectives. Subsequently, Germany annexed large territories in Slovenia, whilst Croatia, as an independent state was to be placed under Italian protectorate, but German influence gradually prevailed there too. Prince Aimone, the Duke of Spoleto, appointed by Italy as King of Croatia, never actually ascended the throne. Territorial disputes arose between Zagreb and Rome, and between Budapest and Rome. Italy committed itself to proclaiming the independence of Montenegro, but not a single member of the Italian Queen's family agreed to take the throne. During World War II, Axis occupation forces partitioned Greece. Italy held nominal sway over much of the country, while Germany held key strategic points like Western Aegean Macedonia, parts of Crete, and the Maritsa River. Italy used Albania to push for a "Greater Albania," sparking territorial friction with Bulgaria. The idea was to expand into Kosovo and Western Vardar Macedonia, as well as Epirus (at Greece's expense). In Epirus, Macedonia, and Thessaly, the pro-Italian Vlach separatist organisation, the Roman Legion, was active.

== The situation of the Jews and the organisation of resistance ==
During the war, the Italian authorities and individual officials took several measures to prevent the deportation of Jews from the territories occupied by Italy. Many Italian military officers, led by General Mario Roatta, commander of the Second Army stationed in the Balkans, realising that handing over the Jews would result in their mass extermination, decided to sabotage the orders for their deportation. The situation of the Jews in the Italian zone was considerably better than in the Bulgarian zone and, in particular, in the German zone. No Jews were deported from the Italian occupation zone. Moreover, the Italians evacuated Jews from the German zone, saving them from death in the Nazi concentration camps. On the other hand, the Italians fiercely persecuted Resistance fighters and organised several massacres of partisans. The Italians also began ethnic cleansing in Slovenia with a view to exterminating and deporting the local Slavic population and replacing it with Italians.

== Italy's armistice with the anti-Hitler coalition and its consequences ==
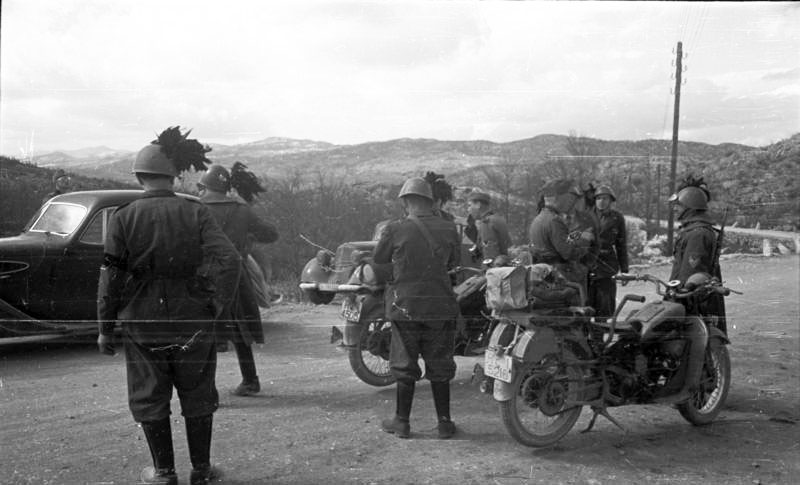
An encounter between Italian and German soldiers in Yugoslavia in April 1941.

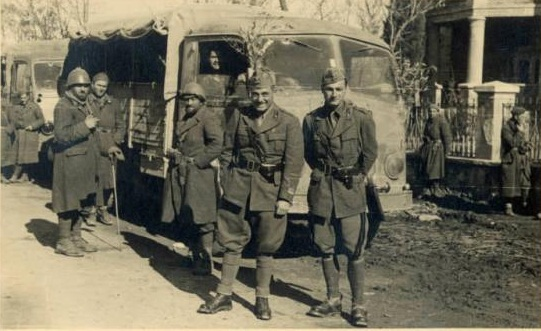
Italian troops during the capture of Ohrid on 12 April 1941

On July 25, 1943, Mussolini was overthrown in Italy. A new Italian government was appointed, headed by Marshal Pietro Badoglio, which in September included representatives of all Italian anti-fascist parties. Italy began to shift away from the Axis. On September 3, an armistice was secretly signed in Sicily between the new Italian government and the Anti-Hitler Coalition, and it was announced on September 8, 1943. On October 13, 1943, Italy declared war on Nazi Germany. Chaos ensued in the occupied zone of the Balkans. Some of the Italian troops stationed on the Balkan Peninsula were captured by the Germans after putting up some resistance. Such was the case with the 33rd "Acqui" Infantry Division on the island of Cephalonia, 5,155 of whose men were executed and 3000 more were taken as prisoners of war. The Second Italian Army in Yugoslavia also put up sustained armed resistance; for the most part, it defected to the Yugoslav partisans, forming the "Garibaldi" Division. Part of the Ninth Italian Army, specifically the "Arezzo" and "Florence" divisions, formed the "Antonio Gramsci" Division, which fought alongside Enver Hoxha’s Albanian partisans. Most of the 24th "Pinerolo" Infantry Division joined the Greek partisans of the EAM and ELAS. Some Italian units declared their allegiance to the new Italian Social Republic, a puppet state of Nazi Germany; this was the case in Slovenia with former units of the Fascist Volunteer Militia for the Protection of National Security, which fought alongside German troops. Overall, the Italian occupation zone in the Balkans was taken over by the Germans, supported by Albanians, Croats, and Bulgarians, by the end of November. In November 1943, the Second Occupation Corps was established, a unit of the Bulgarian Army with headquarters in Drama, which was stationed in the area between the Vardar and Struma rivers, which until then had been a German occupation zone, intending to replace the German army, which had been sent to occupy territories previously held by the Italian army.

== Border disputes with Bulgaria ==
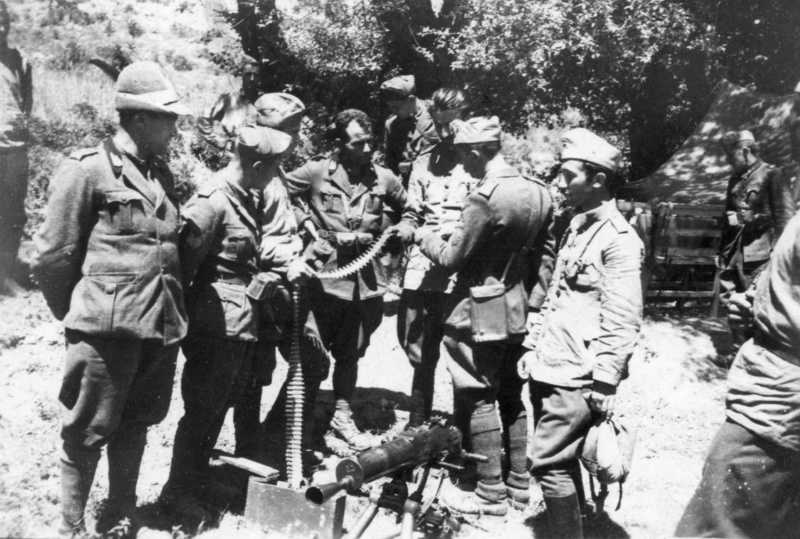
Italian and Bulgarian soldiers at the border in Macedonia examine a disassembled Schwarzlose machine gun in the summer of 1941.

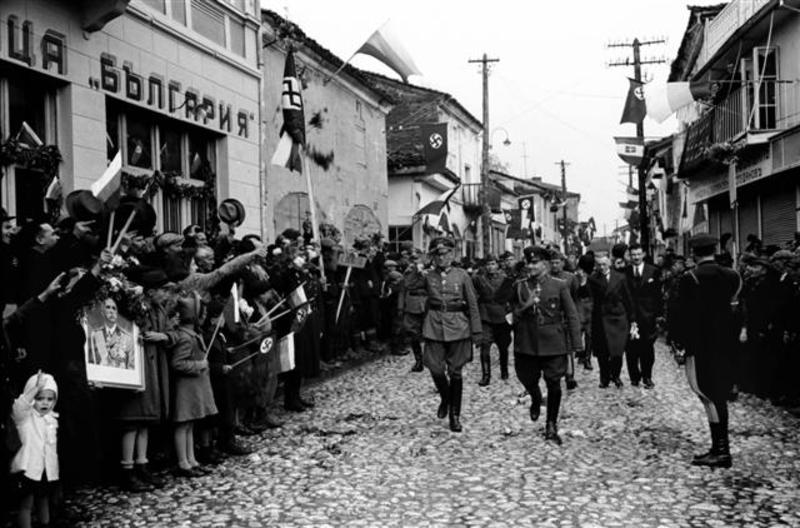
The handover of Ohrid by the Italians to Bulgarian administration, with German mediation, in May 1941.

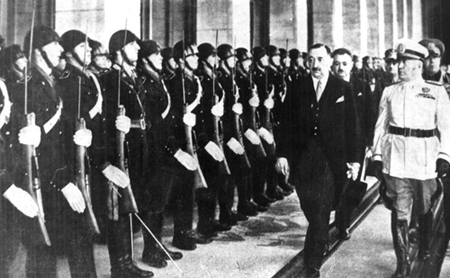
The meeting between Mussolini and Filov to settle the border issue took place in Rome in July 1941.

To prevent future disputes, Boris III traveled to Italy. On June 9, he met with King Victor Emmanuel III of Italy, who advised him to speak directly with Mussolini. The meeting with Il Duce occurred on June 12, 1941, and they agreed to resolve the border disputes during a future visit by Bogdan Filov and Foreign Minister Popov to the Italian capital. Meanwhile, Italy skillfully exploited the irregularities along the demarcation line to make persistent claims, which also led to border incidents. On the night of July 10–11, 1941, the Italians demanded that the Bulgarian border authorities cede the chromium mine northwest of Ljuboten to them. The Bulgarians refused and opened fire, resulting in casualties on both sides. On July 21, 1941, Prof. Bogdan Filov and Minister Ivan Popov met in Rome with King Victor Emmanuel III of Italy and Benito Mussolini. An agreement was reached that the Vienna Agreement would serve as the basis for the border between Bulgaria and Italy, with its precise demarcation to be determined by a joint Italian-Albanian-Bulgarian commission, which would decide on the necessary adjustments and the problem of population transfer. However, the commission never began work because both sides obstructed it, and the contentious issues remained unresolved.

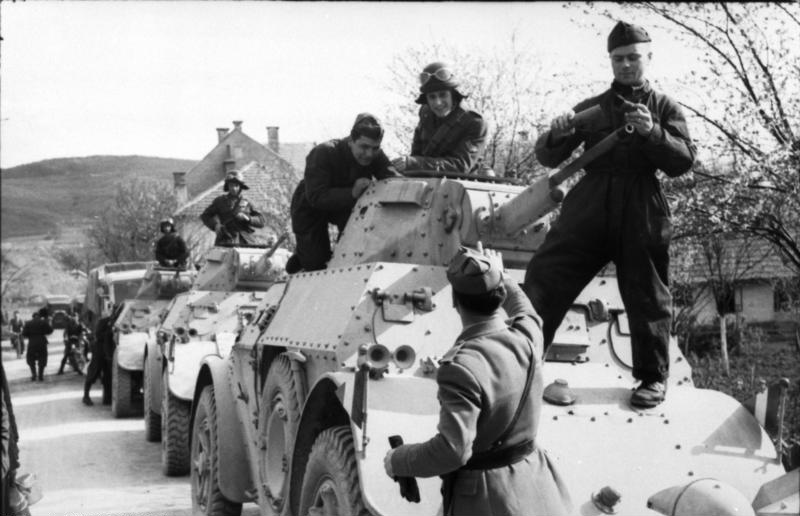
An Italian military unit in the Balkans in 1942

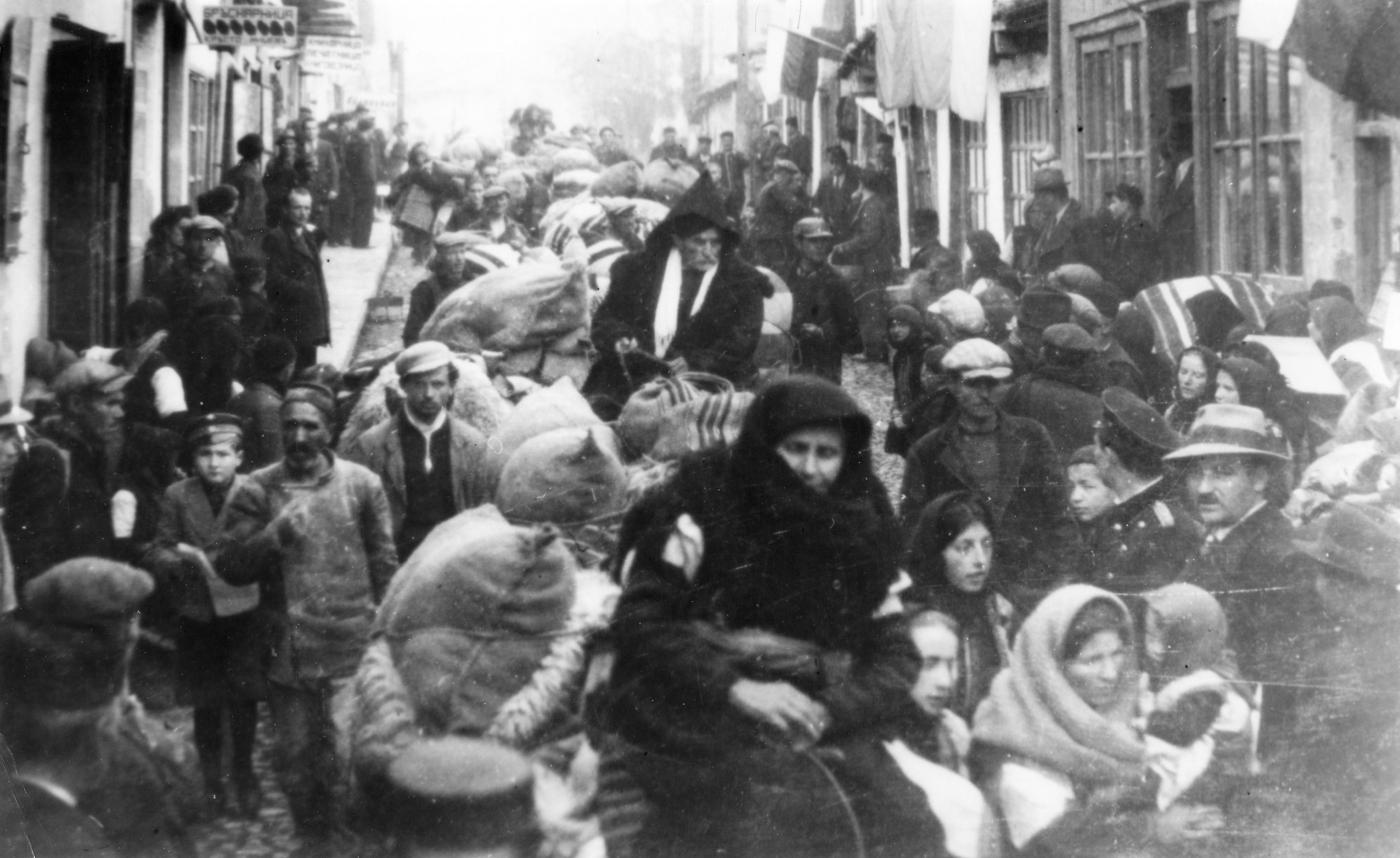
Refugees from Debar who fled the Albanian-controlled zone in 1942 and entered the Bulgarian-controlled zone.

Another Bulgarian-Italian border incident occurred in August 1942 involving new casualties, once again related to the mine near Ljuboten. After the incident, the issue was resolved, and the joint commission was established. The chief delegate of Bulgaria was General Vasil Boydev, commander of the Fifth Army stationed in Macedonia. The commission held meetings in October and November 1942 and in March 1943. The border remainedunchanged as a result of these talks. Thus, on March 29, 1943, the final agreement on the border between Bulgaria and Italy in Macedonia was signed. It was not in effect until July 15, 1943.

The border between the Italian Protectorate of Albania and the Kingdom of Bulgaria roughly begins in present-day Kosovo along a line that runs west of Kaçanik, through Lesok, and then east of the Zhelezna River and Novosej; it then follows the Treska River near the town of Kiçevo and heads south toward Lake Ohrid. It lies west of the villages of Staroec, Belitsa, Velmej, Mešeišta, and Gorenci. As it proceeds southwest, the border between Bulgaria and Albania crosses the Ilinska Mountain. West of Podmol, it reaches the shore of Lake Ohrid. From there, the border heads southeast toward the Monastery of St. Naum. From that monastery, the border runs nearly straight eastward, passing north of many villages including Shipokno, Evla, and Kozyak and south of the cities of Ohrid and Resen. After the lake, the line emerges on the eastern shore north of Peštani, continues through Galichitsa, proceeds east of Koziak, and along the ridge of Baba Mountain reaches the former Greek-Yugoslav border.

== The formation of "Ohrana" and the consequences of Italy's truce with the anti-Hitler coalition ==
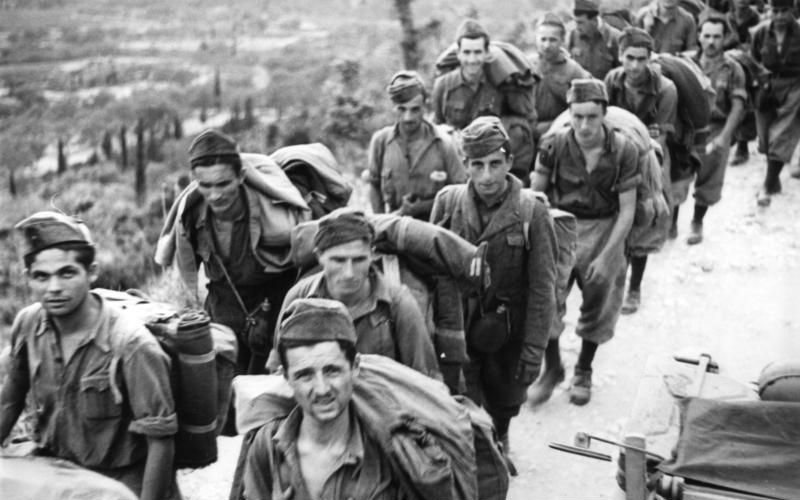
Italian soldiers on the island of Corfu, taken prisoner by German forces in September 1943.

In light of the growing strength of the Greek Resistance, in the winter of 1943, on the orders of Ivan Mihaylov, the Bulgarian officer Andon Kalchev contacted the Italian commandant of Kastoria, Lieutenant Giovanni Ravali, and insisted on measures to protect the Bulgarian population in these westernmost parts of Greek Macedonia from Greek attacks. Since the Italians could not stop the attacks, they agreed. On March 5, 1943, the Bulgarian Committee "Freedom or Death" was officially established in Kastoria. Freedom or Death helped arm local villages with weapons supplied by Italian officers to combat Greek partisans. On March 12, 1943, General Giuseppe del Giudice arrived in the city with an order from the Italian command to deploy regular Italian units to support Bulgarian self-defense against Greek nationalists and Macedonian-oriented communists. Kastoria became the center of the "Ohrana" organization, which included former members of the Internal Macedonian Revolutionary Organization as well as ordinary Bulgarians wishing to defend themselves against attacks by Greek paramilitary bands. On July 25, however, the fascist regime in Italy fell, and anarchy began to take hold in its occupied zone. Beyond the demarcation line, the situation became critical for the Bulgarian population. Local Albanian bandits and Greek nationalists never stopped abusing, looting, and even killing the Bulgarians living there. On August 14, Tsar Boris III was summoned to a meeting at Hitler's headquarters regarding the dire situation facing Germany and its allies on the Eastern Front and in the Balkans. At the meeting, Hitler insisted that Bulgarian divisions occupy the parts of Macedonia falling within the Italian occupation zone in Greece and Albania, while Boris III attempted to deflect the possibility of Bulgarian participation on the Eastern Front, citing a shortage of manpower and equipment, as well as the need for defense against a potential attack by Turkey and that he will not send Bulgarian Jews to Nazi concentaton camps. Vladimir Židovec, the Croatian Minister Plenipotentiary in Sofia, also confirmed the existence of such ideas. A plan for cooperation was outlined to the Croatian diplomat, based on the annexation of all of Western Macedonia, which had until then been part of the Italian occupation zone, to Bulgaria. According to Židovec, the king sincerely believed that Italy's defeat made this possible, provided that the support of the IMRO could also be secured. The death of the Bulgarian monarch shortly thereafter halted the development of this initiative.

== Italian defeat and German occupation of Italian occupation zones ==
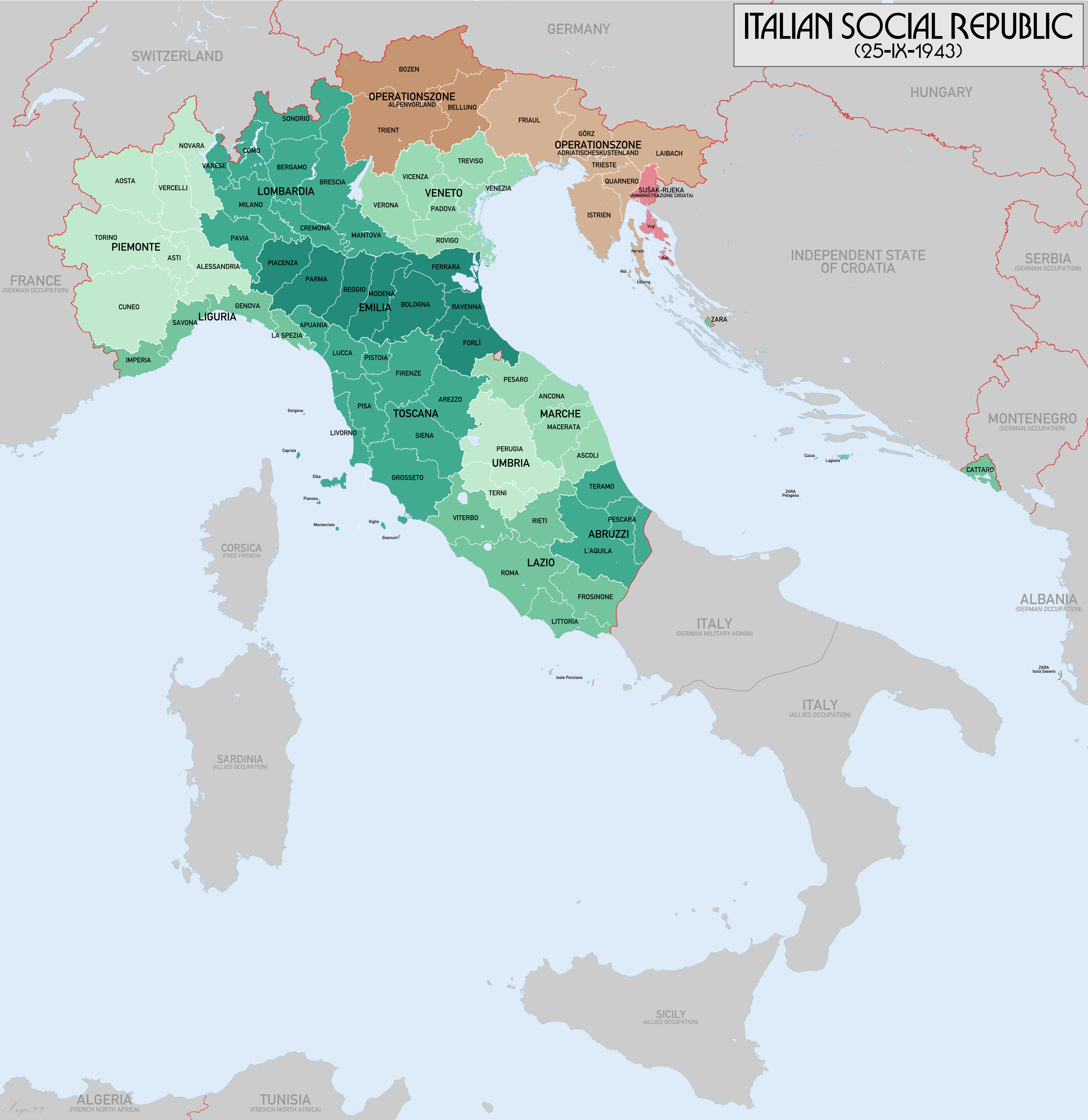
German puppet state led by Mussolini in Northern and Central Italy in 1943 after the Italian armistice with the Allies.

In September 1943, following Italy's surrender, its zone was occupied primarily by German troops. Bulgaria benefited in part from Italy's withdrawal from the Axis as a German ally. It secured an adjustment to the border in the southwestern sector of Vardar Macedonia. Thus, the Bulgarian zone was expanded by about 500 square kilometers. This included about 20 villages in the Ohrid and Resen regions. This border remained in effect until the withdrawal of the Bulgarian army from Vardar Macedonia and most of Aegean Macedonia in early September 1944, when the Bulgarian-controlled parts of the former Italian occupation zone were evacuated by Bulgarian troops.

== See also ==
- Greco-Italian War
- Bulgarian rule of Macedonia, Morava Valley and Western Thrace (1941–1944)

== Sources ==
- Yanko Gochev. "24 МАЙ 1941 г. ОХРИД ВЛИЗА ОКОНЧАТЕЛНО В БЪЛГАРИЯ" [May 24, 1941: Ohrid was finally incorporated into Bulgaria]. All Bulgarians United (in Bulgarian).
- Nikolay Kochankov (2007). "От надежда към покруса: Западна Македония в българската външна политика (1941–1944)" [From Hope to Despair: Western Macedonia in Bulgarian Foreign Policy (1941–1944)] (in Bulgarian). Sofia: Heron Press.
