= Trojani =

Village in Polog Valley, North Macedonia

Trojani Троjани
- Village
- Coordinates: 41°10′42″N 20°46′24″E

Тrojani is a village located in the Оhrid and Debarca municipalities, in the Polog Valley in Republic of North Macedonia.

== Geography ==
The village is located in the Vishovski mountain range, east of the village Orovnik. After being relocated, the village's land was divided between those of Orovnik, Gorno Lakočerej and Vapila.

== History ==
The village was founded at the end of the 16th century and was a defter from 1536 to 1539 and from 1582 to 1583.

According to Bulgarian geographer Vasil Kanchov, Trojani had a population of 20 people in 1900, all of whom were Christian Bulgarians.

=== Aviation accident ===
On 20 November 1993, Avioimpex Flight 110, a Yakovlev Yak-42, was performing an international passenger flight from Geneva, Switzerland to Skopje, the capital of North Macedonia. Due to a blizzard at the destination, the flight diverted to Ohrid Airport in Ohrid. During the approach, the aircraft crashed near Trojani, killing all 116 people on board (one passenger initially survived the crash but died of his injuries eleven days later). This accident became known as North Macedonia's deadliest aviation disaster.
