= Arbinovo =

- Village
- Арбиново
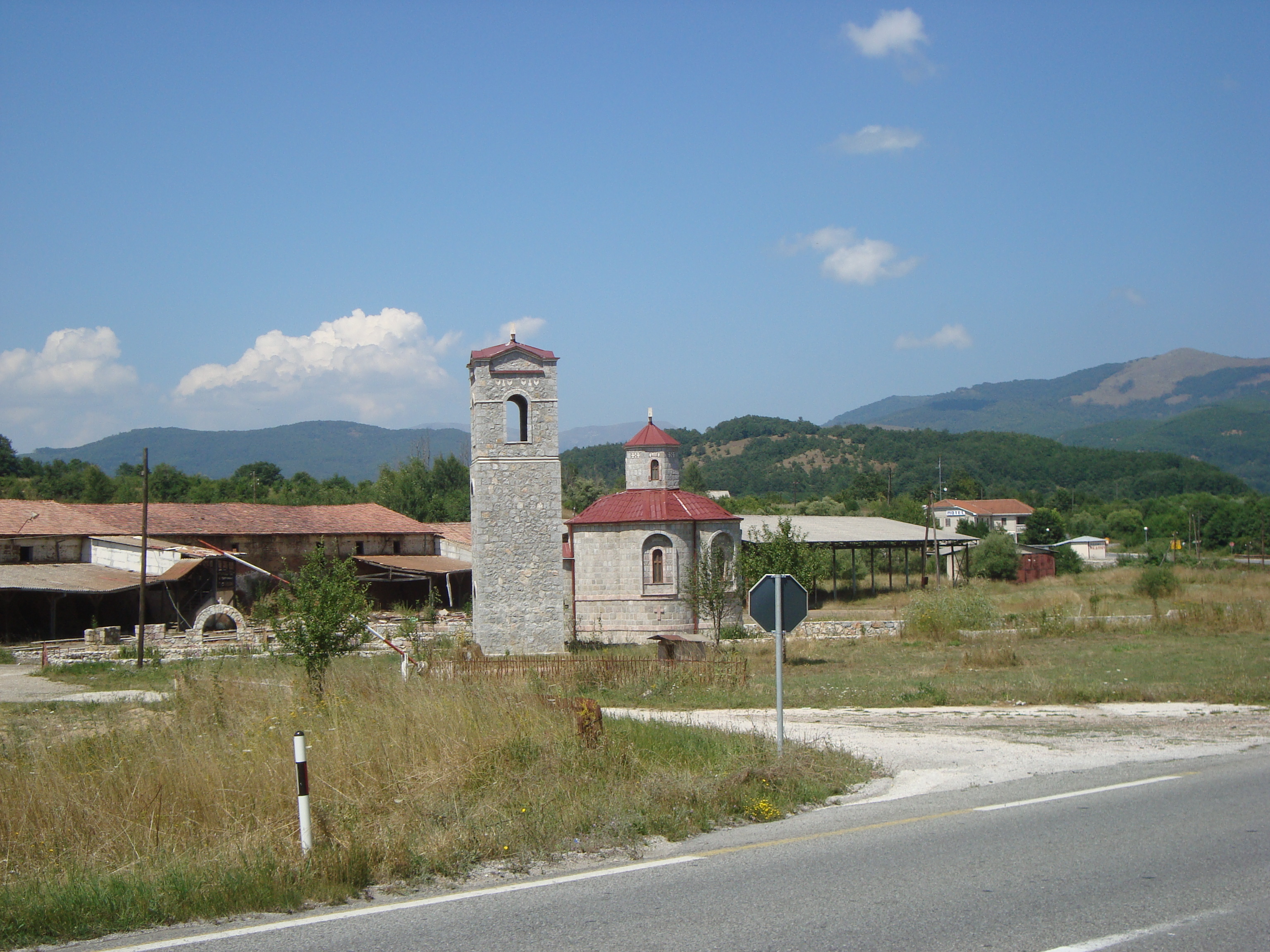
- St. Demetrius Church, Arbinovo

- Location within North Macedonia
- Coordinates: 41°22′14″N 20°49′44″E
- Country: North Macedonia
- Region: Southwestern
- Municipality: Debarca

Population (2002)
  - Total: 26
- Time zone: UTC+1 (CET)
  - Summer (DST): UTC+2 (CEST)
- Car plates: OH
- Website: .

Arbinovo (Macedonian: Арбиново) is a village in the municipality of Debarca, North Macedonia. It used to be part of the former municipality of Belčišta.

== Name ==
In early 20th century, the village Arbinovo appears in the demographic work of Kanchov and map by Jaranov as Ъpбино/Ărbino, in a 1903 map as Arbino and in other documents of the period as Рбину/Rbinu. Local Macedonian residents derive the village name from the Macedonian word врба/vrba for willow tree and the toponym is formed with the suffix ino, along with the additional suffix ovo. Pianka Włodzimierz agrees this is the correct etymology of the placename, due to the many willow trees in Arbinovo and that loss of the initial v sound in the toponym is possible due to local Macedonian speech.

Macedonian linguistics professor Petar Illievski noted that the placename Arbinovo is a hybrid toponym, Aromanian and Slavic in origin and formed from a proto-Albanian foundation and not from the forms H'rbino or Harbino. The toponym is derived from the terms Arban/Alban which in the Aromanian language through metathesis of the sound a into i became Arbin alongside the Slavic suffix ovo. In the Aromanian language the terms for Albanians are Arbinas/Arbines which linguist Iljaz Rexha states supports that Arbinovo in medieval times was inhabited by Albanians.

== Demographics ==
According to the 2002 census, the village had a total of 26 inhabitants. Ethnic groups in the village include:

- Macedonians 26

== See also ==
- Botun
- Laktinje
- Kuratica
- Sirula
