= Laktinje =

- Village
- Лактиње
- Location within North Macedonia
- Coordinates: 41°23′14″N 20°47′47″E
- Country: North Macedonia
- Region: Southwestern
- Municipality: Debarca

Population (2002)
  - Total: 82
- Time zone: UTC+1 (CET)
  - Summer (DST): UTC+2 (CEST)
- Car plates: OH
- Website: .

Laktinje (Macedonian: Лактиње) is a village in the municipality of Debarca, North Macedonia. It used to be part of the former municipality of Belčišta.

== Name ==
Inhabitants from Laktinje associate the name of the settlement with the Латините/Latinite (Latins), due to there being an old graveyard in the village. Pianka Włodzimierz states it could be possible that the placename is derived from the name Vlah'ta or Vlah'tin, ultimately from the form Vlah. In Western Macedonian dialects, dropping the initial v and substituting it for a h sound before the consonant occurs sporadically is a regular phenomenon which Włodzimierz proposes could have happened in this instance. Włodzimierz also states that the name could originate from a lost appellative лактина/Laktina meaning 'a bend on a river or road' (as the village is located on such a bend), ultimately from the collective form лакед/laked < лакътъ/Lak't.

== Demographics ==
According to the 2002 census, the village had a total of 82 inhabitants. Ethnic groups in the village include:

- Macedonians 81
- Serbs 1

== See also ==
- Arbinovo
- Botun
- Kuratica
- Sirula
- Vlachs
