= Slatino, Debarca =

Slatino Слатино
- Village
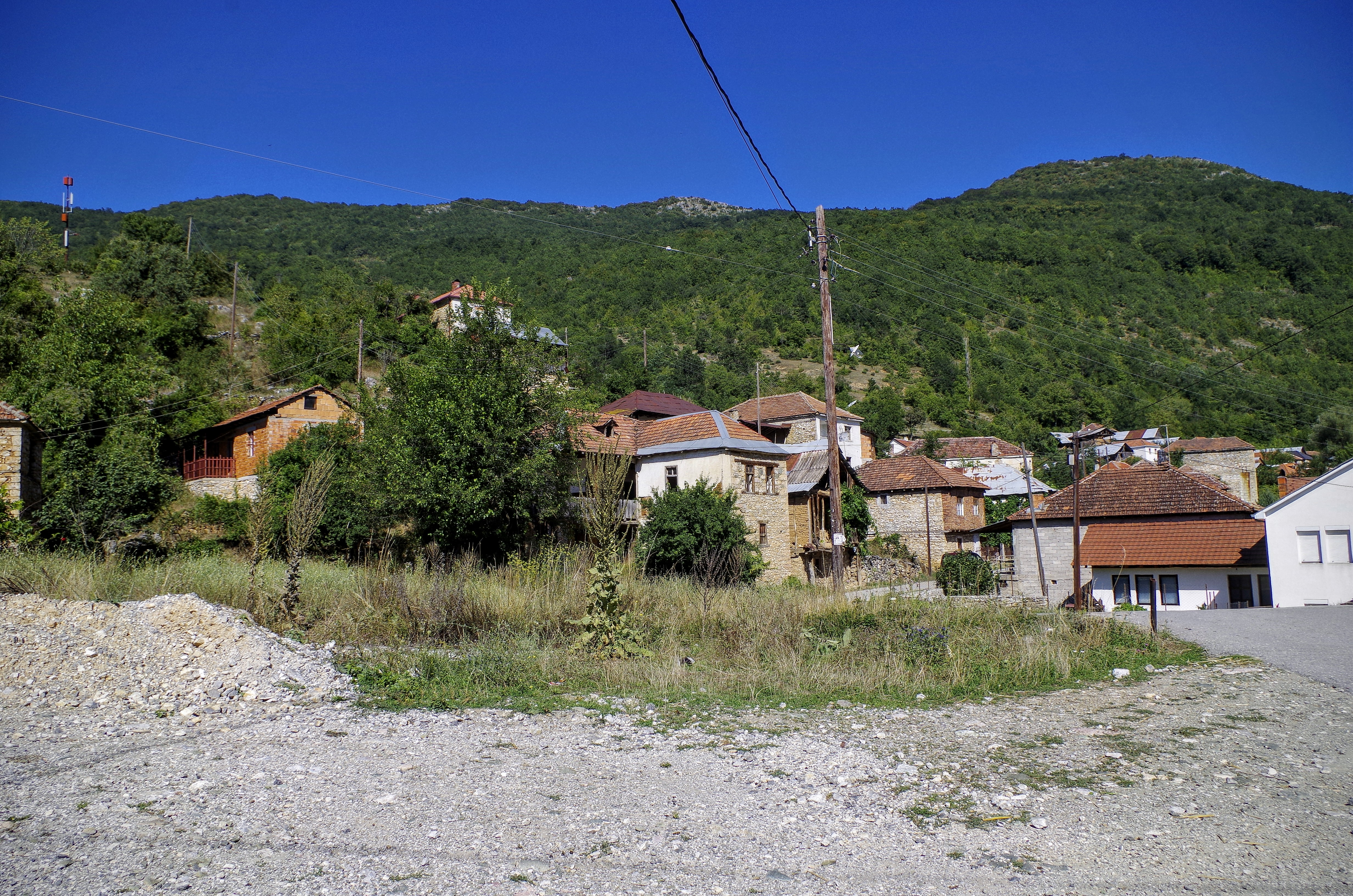

- Location within North Macedonia
- Coordinates: 41°20′54″N 20°51′59″E
- Country: North Macedonia
- Region: Southwestern
- Municipality: Debarca

Population (2002)
  - Total: 161

Languages
  - Official: Macedonian
- Time zone: UTC+1 (CET)
- PIN: 6340
- Area code: +389 (0)46
- Website: link

Slatino (Macedonian: Слатино) is a village in the municipality of Debarca, North Macedonia. It used to be part of the former municipality of Belčišta.

== Geography ==
There are three villages named Slatino in North Macedonia, one in Tetovo, one in Brodsky, and one in Debarca. Slantino village is located in Debarca, on the eastern slopes of Ilinska Mountain. Slatina Lake, which got its name from the village, sits to the south, supplying the Slatina River. Slatino is considered a hilly region.

== History ==
The oldest written record of the villagers is the "Verbose census defter the Sandzak of Ohrid" written in 1582, which tallied the population of Slatino at 327 residents, all Christians. According to the researcher Milivoj Kosteski, in 1953 Slatino had 1,016 people living in it. Since then, the population has steadily declined, today having about 100 residents.

Slatino has historically been a poor mountain village, with immigrant workers leaving the village for work abroad well into the second half of the 19th century. Most migrant workers left in the spring for Wallachia, Serbia and Bulgaria, and returned in the fall. The largest wave of emigration affected the village from 1909 to 1912 when passenger ships opened transport to Canada and Argentina. Those that immigrated to Canada later left for Australia due to lack of work. The second great wave of emigration lasted from 1960 to 1970, though emigration continues to this day. Current migrant workers bring with them and their families to Australia, where today over 120 families make their home. Several families now work in the Iron Grinvil and Port Kembla.

In the village there are two churches, both of which were built in the 19th century as a monastery. The High Church "Holy Mother" was secretly built, as there was no permit for its construction available. It was painted after the Ilinden Uprising in 1912 by brothers Dimitri Mijak and George Colak. The lower church is called "Old Saint weeks." Work began on the lower church in 1808, and was completed in 1858. The monastery of St. John the Baptist is also thought to have been built nearby.

127 villagers participated in World War II, of which seven were killed and nine wounded. There is a memorial at the village entrance.

== Demographics ==
According to the statistics of the Bulgarian ethnographer Vasil Kanchov from 1900, 960 inhabitants lived in the village of Slatino, all Bulgarians.

According to the Secretary of the Bulgarian Exarchate Dimitar Mišev ("La Macédoine et sa Population Chrétienne"), in 1905 there were 1040 Bulgarians (exarchists) in Slatino.

According to the 2002 census, the village had a total of 161 inhabitants. Ethnic groups in the village include:

- Macedonians 160
- Others 1

== Government and politics ==
Currently the village falls within the expanded Municipality of Debarca, which was created after the former municipalities Belcista and Meseista merged during the new territorial division of Macedonia in 2006. From 1996-2006, the village was within the former Municipality Belcista. The villages has gone through several reclassifications through the past century, from 1965 to 1996, the village was located within the municipality of Ohrid, and until 1965 the village was part of the former Municipality Belcista, while from 1952 to 1955, the village was contained within the Municipality Izdeglavje, which also containted the villages of Slatina, Izdeglavje, Ozdoleni, Slatinski Chiflik and Soshani. For a short time, 1950-1952, the village was part of the former municipality Slatina Chiflik, which also contained the villages Izdeglavje, Ozdoleni, Slatina, Slatina Chiflik and Soshani.
