= Volino =

Volino Волино
- Village
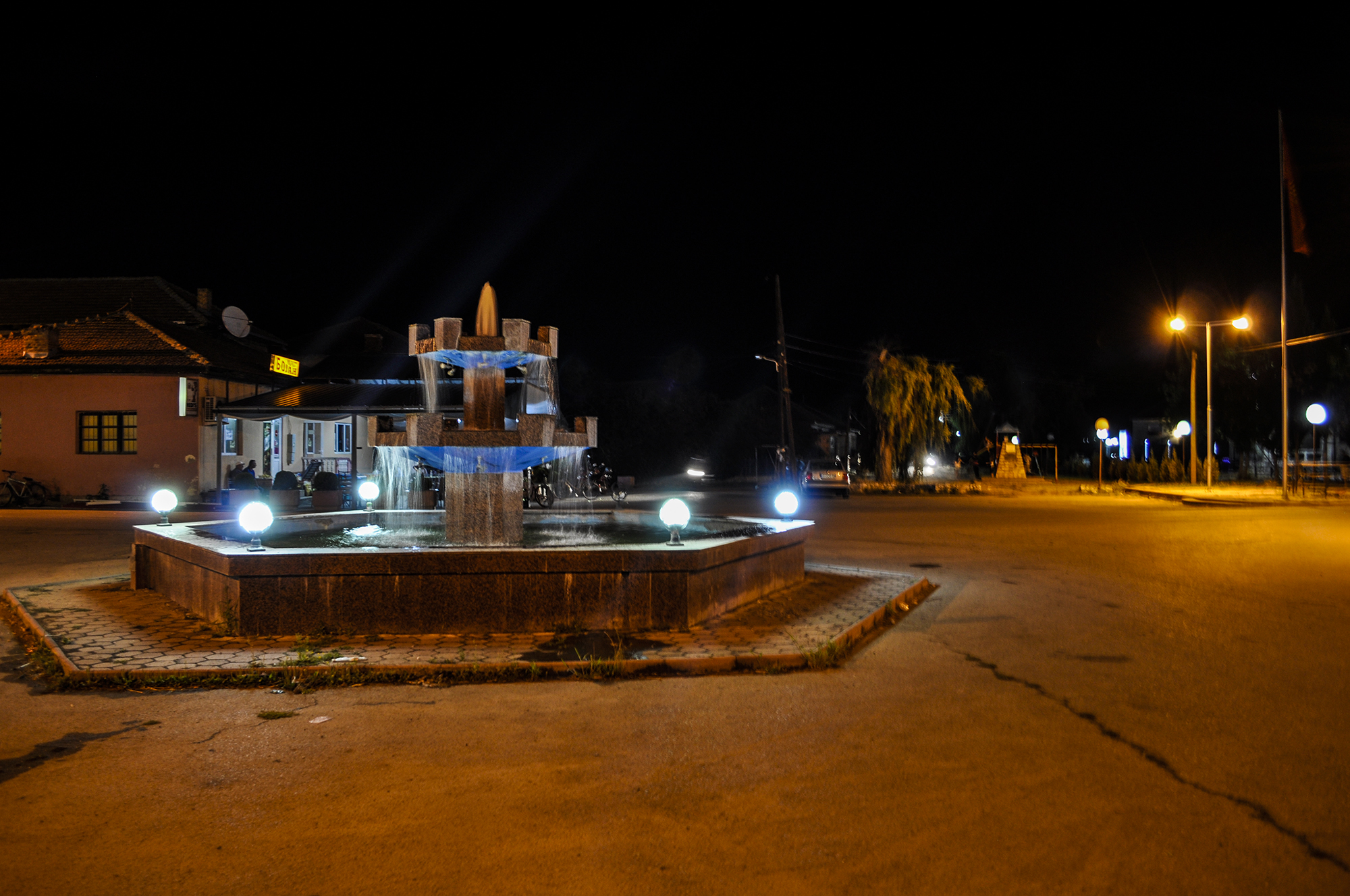
- Fountain in Volino

- Location within North Macedonia
- Coordinates: 41.220398°N 20.740776°E
- Country: North Macedonia
- Region: Southwestern
- Municipality: Debarca

Area
  - Total: 5 km^{2} (1.9 sq mi)
- Elevation: 710 m (2,330 ft)

Population (2021)
  - Total: 368
  - Density: 74/km^{2} (190/sq mi)
- Time zone: UTC+1 (CET)
  - Summer (DST): UTC+2 (CEST)

Volino (Macedonian: Волино) is a village in the municipality of Debarca, North Macedonia. It used to be part of the former municipality of Mešeišta. In 2021, it had a population of 368.

== History ==
According to Ethnographie des vilayets d'Andrinople: de Monastir, et de Salonique, which was published in 1878, the village had 45 houses and a population of 120 Bulgarian males.

Per Vasil Kanchov's statistics in 1900, the village had a population of 330, all Christian Bulgarians.

In 1901, the village is shown to have 35 houses in the Ethnographic Map of the Bitola Vilayet.

Secretary of the Bulgarian Exarchate, Dimitar Mishev, (Note: Dimitar Mishev wrote under the pseudonym "Brancoff".) recorded 280 Exarchist Bulgarians in the village in 1905.

In 1917, the village was part of Мешеишка община (Mesheishka Municipality) under Bulgarian occupation, with a recorded population of 374.

In 1996, the village was part of the Mešeišta Municipality. Following the dissolution of the municipality in 2004, it became part of the Debarca Municipality.

== Geography ==
The village is situated in the Debarca Municipality, (Note: In the source from 1998, the village is listed as part of Mešeišta Municipality. However, the Municipality was abolished in 2004 and Volino became part of the Debarca Municipality.) around 15 kilometers away from the center of Ohrid. It is plainy and has an elevation of 710 meters. Its village area is small, with a surface area of 5 square kilometers.

== Economy ==
The village's economy is oriented towards agriculture, with 451.2 hectares of arable land and 9.5 hectares of pastures, but no forest land.

== Demographics ==
=== Ethnic groups ===
The historical ethnic makeup of this village is as follows: (Note: In 1948, the population was 609, with no recorded ethnic composition.)

| Ethnicity | Year | | | | | | | |
| Ethnicity | 1953 | 1961 | 1971 | 1981 | 1991 | 1994 | 2002 | 2021 |
|---|---|---|---|---|---|---|---|---|
| Macedonians | 662 | 734 | 749 | 862 | 689 | 512 | 462 | 342 |
| Albanians | 4 | 4 | 0 | 0 | 0 | 0 | 0 | 0 |
| Turks | 0 | 1 | 0 | 0 | 0 | 0 | 0 | 0 |
| Roma | 0 | 0 | 0 | 0 | 0 | 0 | 0 | 0 |
| Aromanians | 0 | 0 | — | 0 | 0 | 0 | 0 | 0 |
| Serbs | 0 | 0 | 0 | 0 | 0 | 0 | 0 | 0 |
| Bosniaks | 0 | 0 | — | — | — | 0 | 0 | 0 |
| Others | 0 | 0 | 3 | 1 | 1 | 0 | 0 | 0 |
| Total | 666 | 739 | 752 | 863 | 690 | 512 | 462 | 368 |

=== Sex distribution ===
The historical population of both sexes in this village is as follows:

| Sex | Year | | | | | | | |
| Sex | 1948 | 1953 | 1961 | 1971 | 1981 | 1991 | 1994 | 2002 |
|---|---|---|---|---|---|---|---|---|
| Male | 308 | 335 | 370 | 399 | 456 | 367 | 262 | 236 |
| Female | 301 | 331 | 369 | 353 | 407 | 323 | 250 | 226 |

== Sports ==
Local football club FK Sateska plays in the Macedonian Third League (Southwest Division).
