= Gorenci =

Gorenci may refer to:

- Gorenci, Centar Župa, a village in North Macedonia
- Gorenci, Črnomerec, a hamlet and street of Črnomerec, Croatia
- Gorenci, Debarca, a village in North Macedonia
- Gorenci, Kupinec, a hamlet of Kupinec, Croatia
- Gorenci, Vrbovsko, a village in Vrbovsko, Croatia
- Gorenci, Generalski Stol, another name of Gorinci in Generalski Stol, Croatia

== See also ==
- Goranci (disambiguation)
- Gorjanci
