= Izdeglavje =

Izdeglavje Издеглавје
- Village
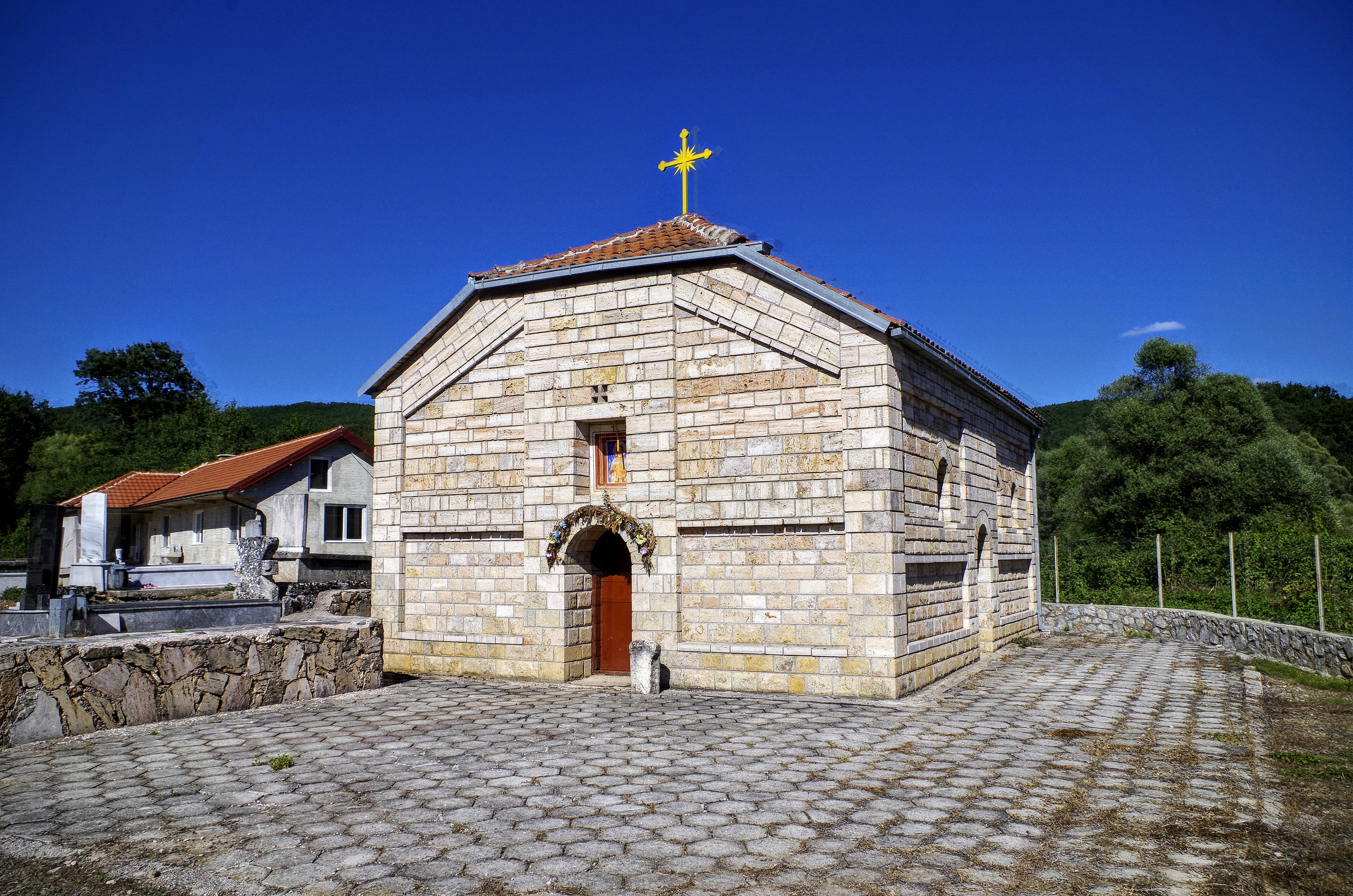
- St. Demetrious Church

- Location within North Macedonia
- Coordinates: 41.336378°N 20.827370°E
- Country: North Macedonia
- Region: Southwestern
- Municipality: Debarca

Population (2002)
  - Total: 136
- Time zone: UTC+1 (CET)
  - Summer (DST): UTC+2 (CEST)
- Website: .

Izdeglavje (Macedonian: Издеглавје) is a village in the municipality of Debarca, North Macedonia. It used to be part of the former municipality of Belčišta.

== History ==
Izdeglavje is home to three medieval archaeological sites: Manastirište, Zglavinica, and Saint Demetrius.

A locality in the village bears the name Arbajnca, stemming from the old South Slavic ethnonym for Albanian and the Slavic suffix ica, suggesting direct linguistic contact with Albanians or the former presence of an assimilated Albanian community.

Per Vasil Kanchov, Izdeglavje in 1900 had 220 residents, all Bulgarian Christians. In 1905, Dimitar Mishev recorded 224 Bulgarian Exharchist residents.

On 21 October 1943, the First Priesthood Council was organised in Izdeglavje, where the decision to rebuild the Ohrid Archdiocese as the Macedonian Orthodox Church was decided.

== Demographics ==
According to the 2002 census, the village had a total of 136 inhabitants. Ethnic groups in the village include:

- Macedonians 136
- Other 3

== Culture ==
=== Churches ===
The main church of the village is the Church of Saint Demetrius, built in the 20th century. The Church of Saint Nicholas is listed as a cultural landmark.
