= FK Sateska =

- Full name: Fudbalski Klub Sateska
- Founded: 1949
- Ground: Stadion Gjorgov Most
- Capacity: 500
- Chairman: Zlate Skeparoski
- Manager: Igor Markoski
- League: Macedonian Third League (Southwest)
- 2024–25: 3rd
Home colours

FK Sateska (Macedonian: ФК Сатеска) is a football club based in the village of Volino, Debarca Municipality, North Macedonia. They are currently competing in the Macedonian Third League (Southwest Division)

== History ==
The club was founded in 1949.
