= Gorenci, Debarca =

Gorenci Горенци Gorencë
- Village
- Location within North Macedonia
- Coordinates: 41°11′25″N 20°45′27″E
- Country: North Macedonia
- Region: Southwestern
- Municipality: Debarca

Population (2021)
  - Total: 223
- Time zone: UTC+1 (CET)
  - Summer (DST): UTC+2 (CEST)
- Car plates: OH

Gorenci (Macedonian: Горенци, Albanian: Gorencë) is a village in the municipality of Debarca, North Macedonia. It used to be part of the former municipality of Mešeišta. It is located close to Ohrid Airport.

== Demographics ==
During the Ottoman period, Gorenci was a chiflik settlement and inhabited by an Orthodox Macedonian population. During the course of the 20th century, Albanians have settled in the village.

As of the 2021 census, Gorenci had 223 residents with the following ethnic composition:

- Macedonians 87
- Persons for whom data are taken from administrative sources 75
- Albanians 57
- Others 4

According to the 2002 census, the village had a total of 316 inhabitants. Ethnic groups in the village include:

- Macedonians 169
- Albanians 145
- Others 2
