= Zlesti =

Zlesti Злести
- Village
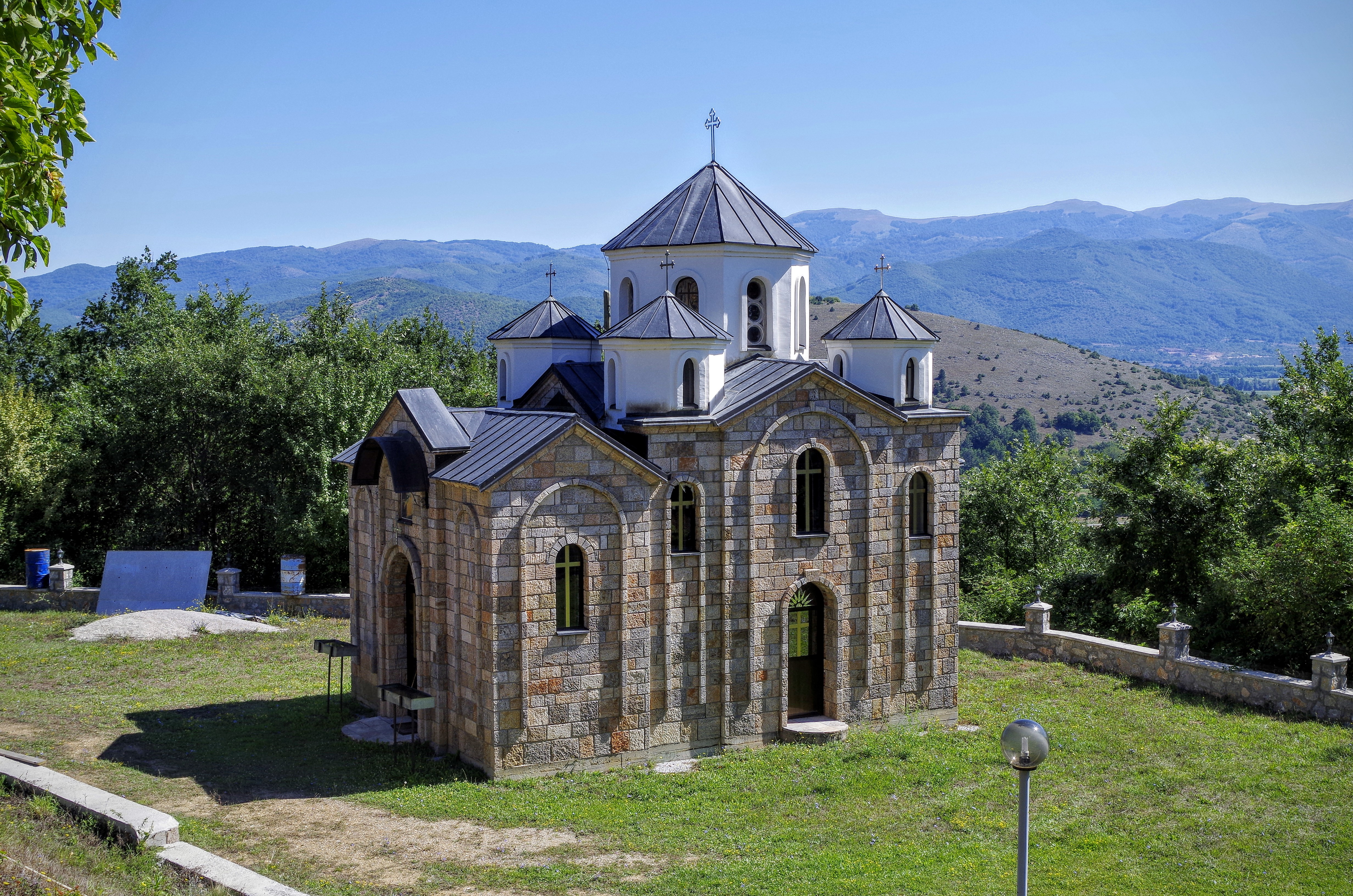
- Church of the Presentation of the Theotokos

- Location within North Macedonia
- Coordinates: 41.282253°N 20.829836°E
- Country: North Macedonia
- Region: Southwestern
- Municipality: Debarca

Population (2002)
  - Total: 294
- Time zone: UTC+1 (CET)
  - Summer (DST): UTC+2 (CEST)
- Website: .

Zlesti (Macedonian: Злести) is a village in the municipality of Debarca, North Macedonia. It used to be part of the former municipality of Belčišta.

== Demographics ==
According to the 2002 census, the village had a total of 294 inhabitants. Ethnic groups in the village include:

- Macedonians 291
- Other 3
