= Slivovo, Debarca =

Slivovo Сливово
- Village
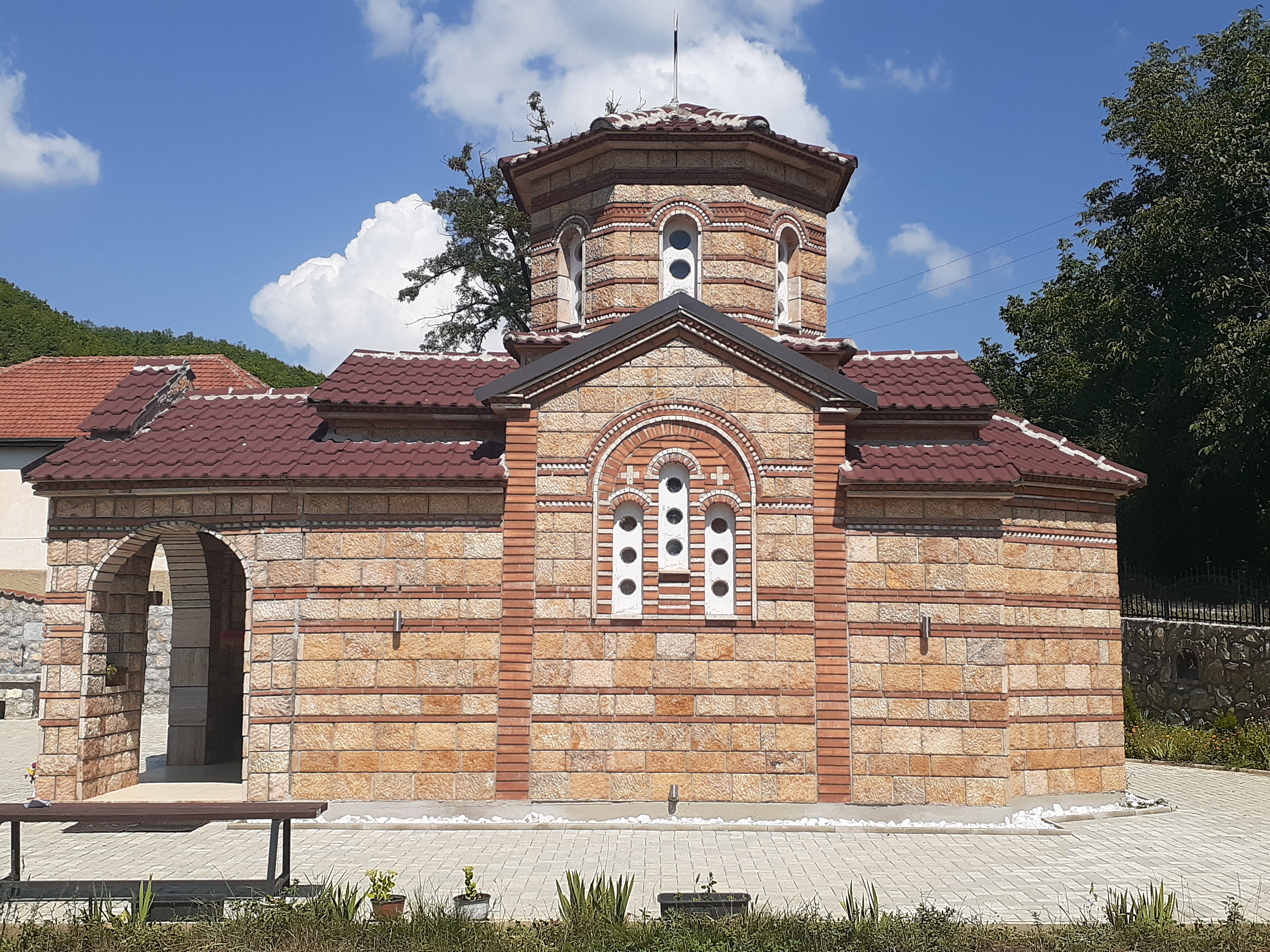

- Location within North Macedonia
- Country: North Macedonia
- Region: Southwestern
- Municipality: Debarca

Population (2002)
  - Total: 16
- Time zone: UTC+1 (CET)
  - Summer (DST): UTC+2 (CEST)
- Website: .

Slivovo (Macedonian: Сливово) is a small village in the municipality of Debarca, North Macedonia. It used to be part of the former municipality of Belčišta.

== Demographics ==
According to the census of 2002, the village has a population of 16, all Macedonians.
