= Orovnik =

Orovnik Оровник
- Village
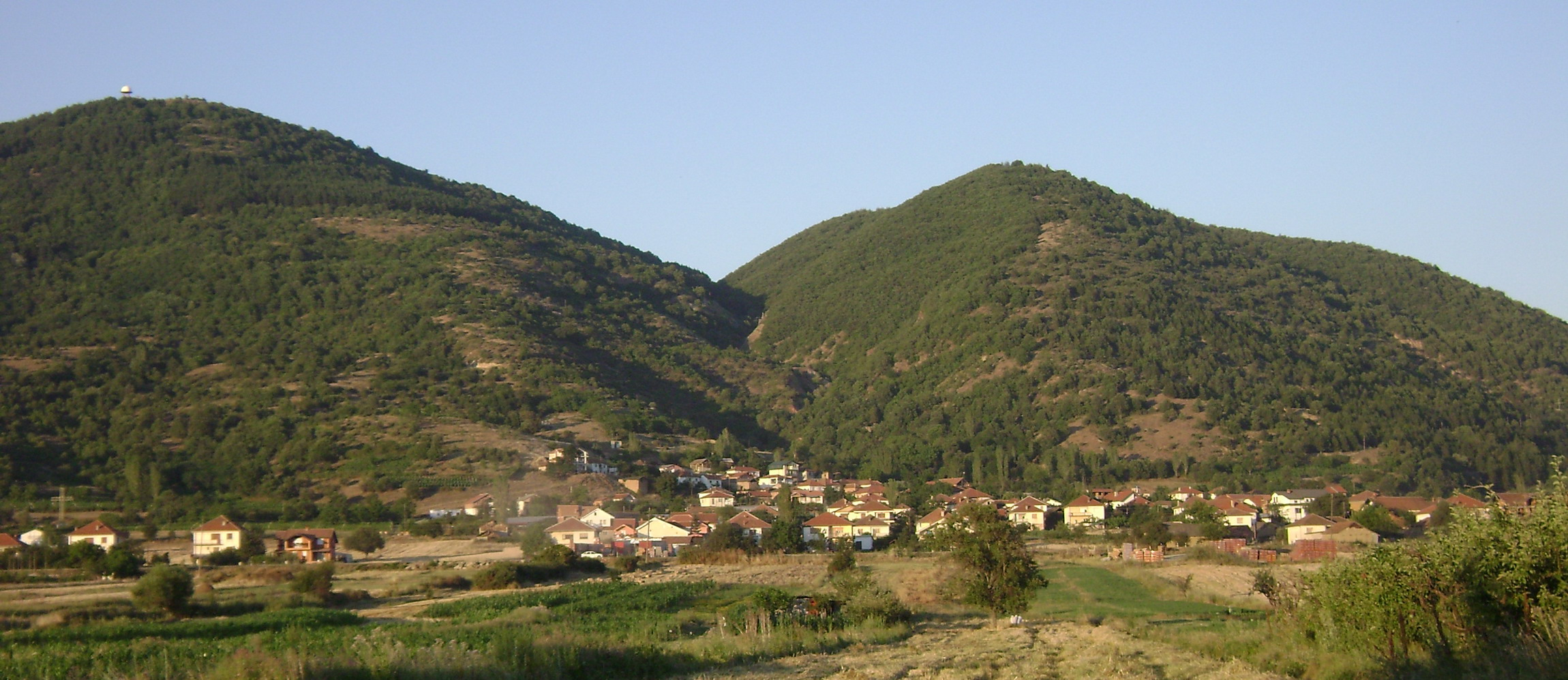

- Location within North Macedonia
- Coordinates: 41.173397°N 20.754439°E
- Country: North Macedonia
- Region: Southwestern
- Municipality: Debarca

Population (2021)
  - Total: 472
- Time zone: UTC+1 (CET)
  - Summer (DST): UTC+2 (CEST)
- Website: .

Orovnik (Macedonian: Оровник) is a village in the municipality of Debarca, North Macedonia. It used to be part of the former municipality of Mešeišta. It is located close to Ohrid Airport.

== Demographics ==
As of the 2021 census, Orovnik had 472 residents with the following ethnic composition:

- Macedonians 453
- Persons for whom data are taken from administrative sources 18
- Others 1

According to the 2002 census, the village had a total of 440 inhabitants. Ethnic groups in the village include:

- Macedonians 439
- Serbs 1
