= Lešani =

Lešani Лешани
- Village
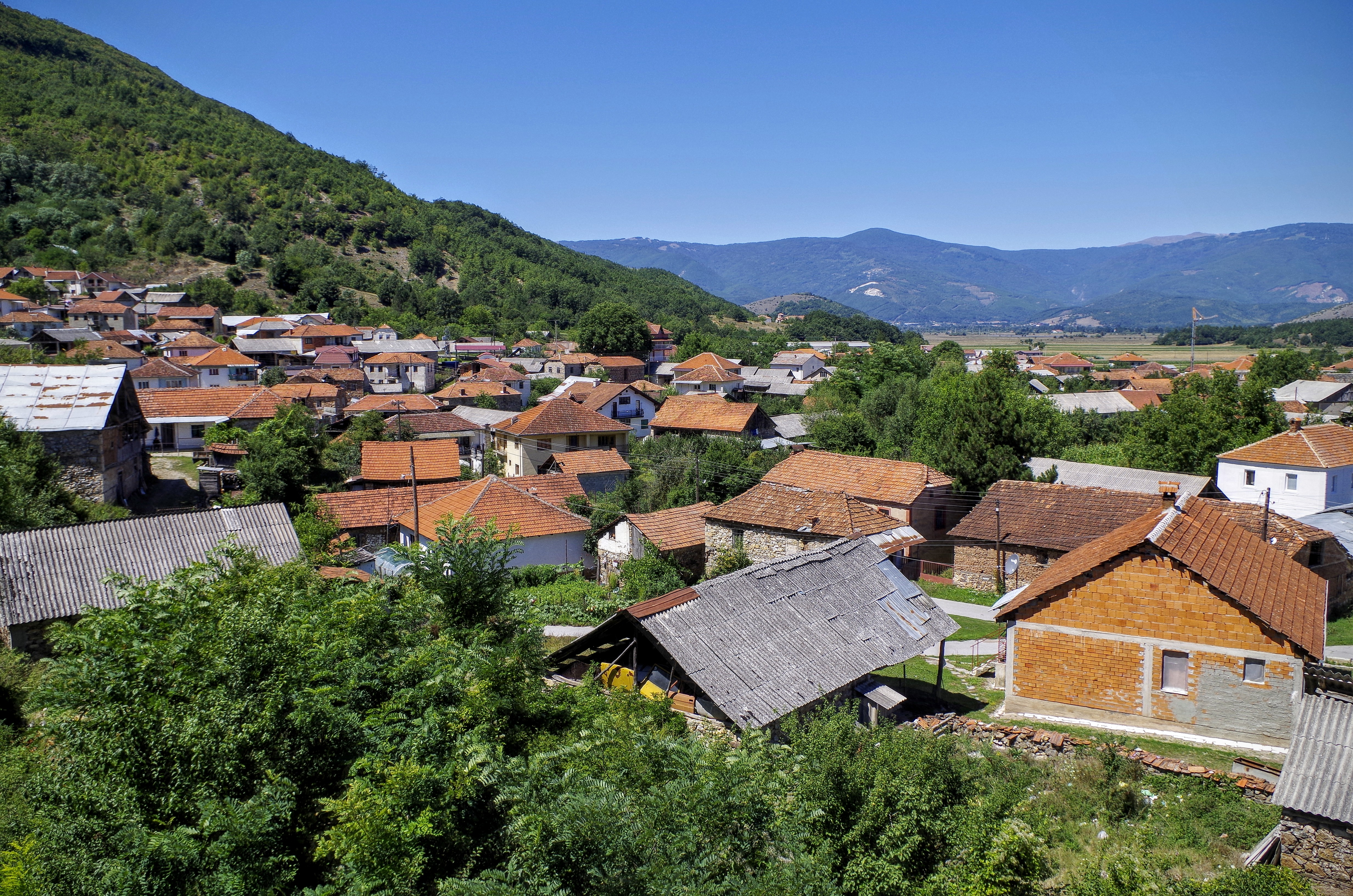
- View of Lešani

- Location within North Macedonia
- Coordinates: 41.277899°N 20.860636°E
- Country: North Macedonia
- Region: Southwestern
- Municipality: Debarca

Population (2002)
  - Total: 484
- Time zone: UTC+1 (CET)
  - Summer (DST): UTC+2 (CEST)
- Website: .

Lešani (Macedonian: Лешани) is a village in the municipality of Debarca, North Macedonia. It used to be part of the former municipality of Belčišta.

== Demographics ==
According to the 2002 census, the village had a total of 484 inhabitants. Ethnic groups in the village include:

- Macedonians 483
- Serbs 1
