= Avioimpex =

Airline of Macedonia

IATA	ICAO	Call sign
M4	AXX	IMPEX
- Founded: September 1992
- Ceased operations: September 2002
- Hubs: Skopje Airport
- Focus cities: Ohrid Airport
- Headquarters: Skopje, Republic of Macedonia
- Key people: General Director
- Website: http://www.unet.com.mk/mbc/avioimpex.htm

Avioimpex was an airline carrier from the Republic of Macedonia (now North Macedonia), based in Skopje. It operated both scheduled and charter services to and from Skopje and Ohrid.

== History ==
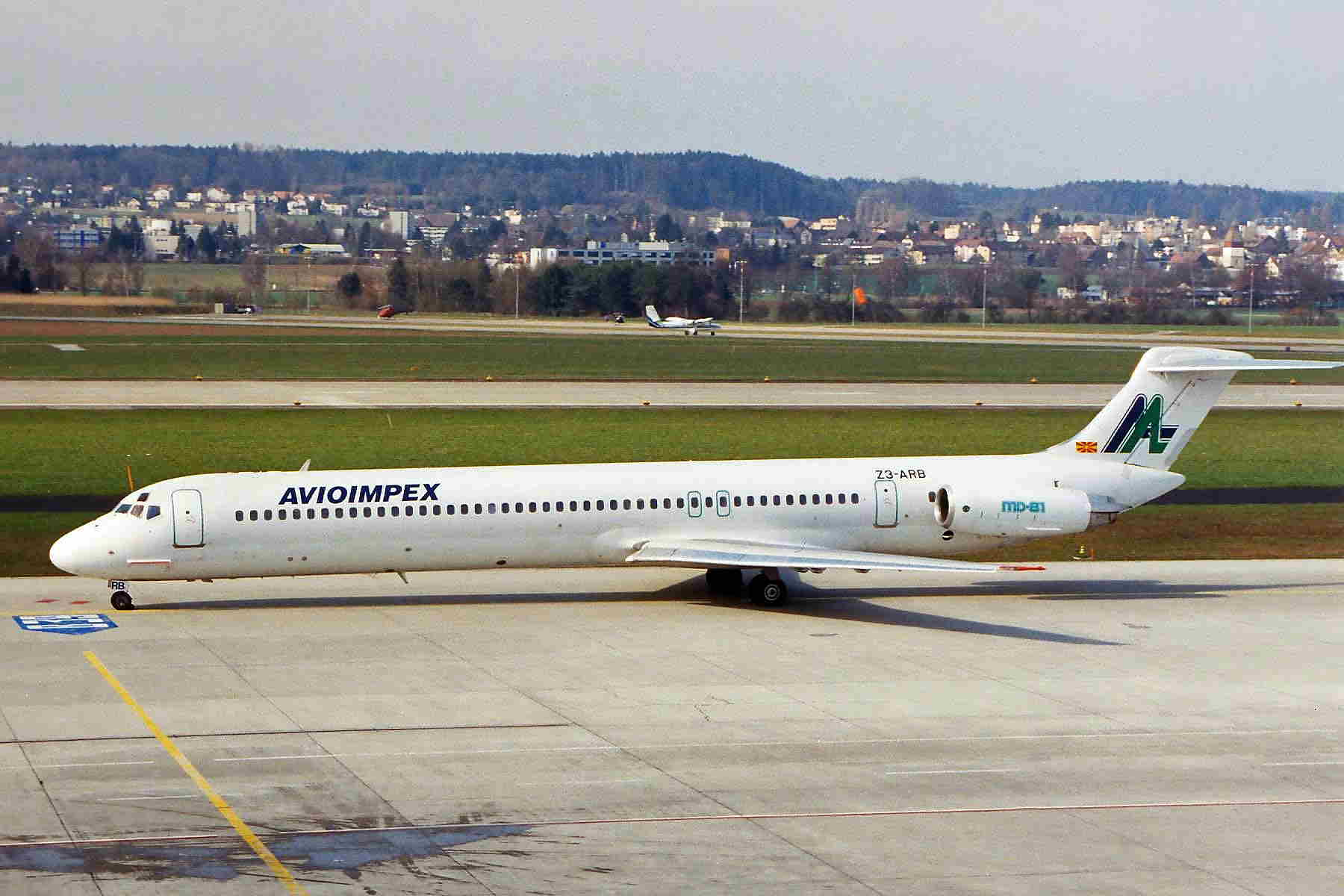
Avioimpex McDonnell Douglas MD-80 33RC.

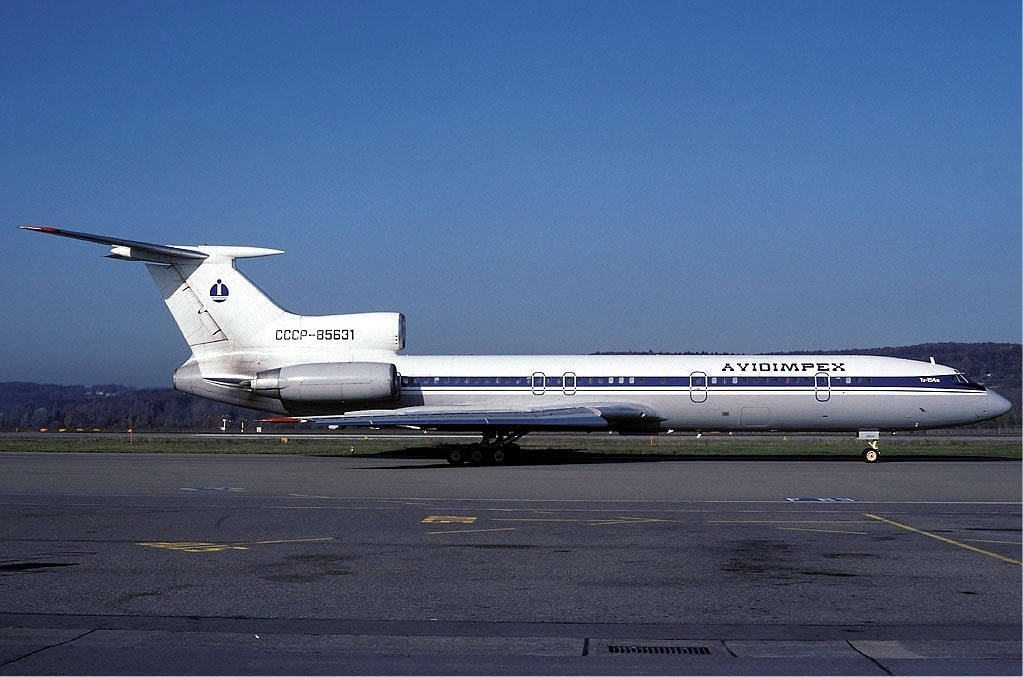
Avioimpex Tupolev Tu-154 in 1993.

Avioimpex was established as Interimpex-Avioimpex in September 1992. The airline changed its name to Avioimpex on 2 November 1999, and operations were suspended in September 2002 after the Macedonian CAA revoked its operating license due to financial difficulties.

== Destinations ==
Avioimpex operated from Skopje and Ohrid, main focus was on Switzerland (Zurich)

== Fleet ==
The fleet included:

- 1 McDonnell Douglas DC-9
- 5 McDonnell Douglas MD-80
- 3 Tupolev Tu-154
- 2 Yakovlev Yak-42

== Accidents ==
On 20 November 1993 Avioimpex Flight 110, a Yak-42, crashed near Ohrid Airport. The aircraft was on a flight from Geneva, Switzerland to Skopje, Macedonia, but had been diverted to the airport in Ohrid due to poor weather conditions.

On final approach the aircraft struck into the Trojan Hills, that lie in close vicinity to the airport. All eight crew members and 116 passengers died. One passenger, identified as Rade Jevremovich, survived the initial impact but died from his injuries on December 2.
