= Avioimpex Flight 110 =

1993 aviation accident

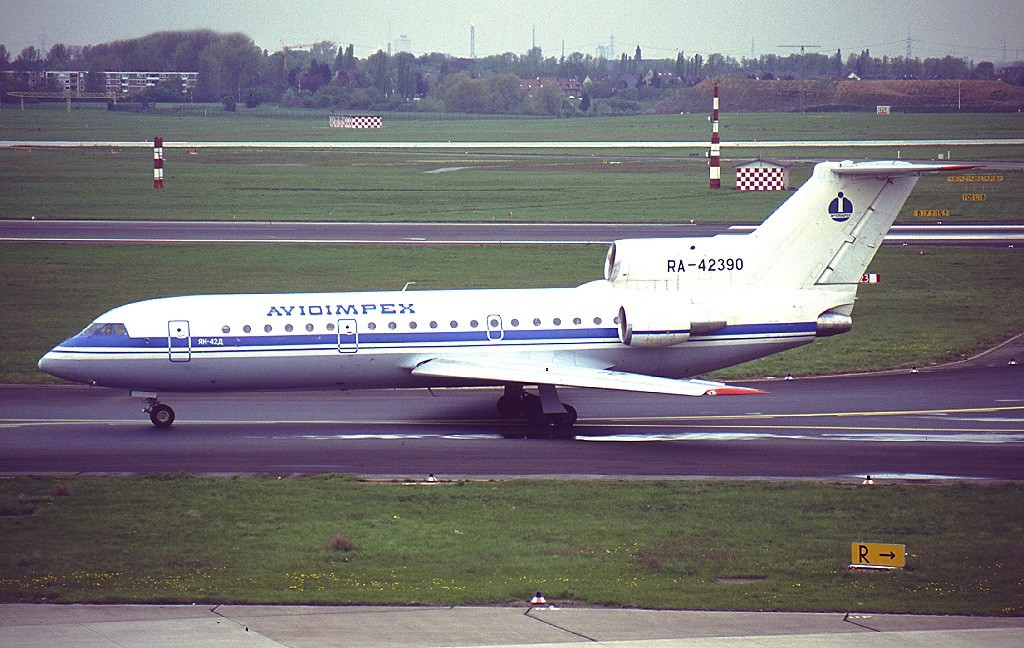
- RA-42390, the aircraft involved in the crash, seen at Düsseldorf Airport in April 1993

Accident
- Date: 20 November 1993
- Summary: Controlled flight into terrain
- Site: Trojani, near Ohrid Airport, Ohrid, Republic of Macedonia; 41.185°N 20.7761°E

Aircraft
- Aircraft type: Yakovlev Yak-42
- Operator: Saratov Airlines on behalf of Avioimpex
- IATA flight No.: M4110
- ICAO flight No.: AXX110
- Call sign: IMPEX 110
- Registration: RA-42390
- Flight origin: Geneva International Airport
- Destination: Skopje Airport
- Occupants: 116
- Passengers: 108
- Crew: 8
- Fatalities: 116
- Survivors: 0

Avioimpex Flight 110 was a scheduled international passenger flight operated by Avioimpex that crashed on 20 November 1993 while flying from Geneva to Skopje. Before the disaster, Flight 110 had deviated from Skopje International Airport to Ohrid Airport due to a blizzard in the Macedonian capital. The plane, a Yakovlev Yak-42, was carrying 108 passengers and eight crew, and crashed about 7 kilometres (4.3 mi; 3.8 nmi) east of Ohrid Airport. All 116 people on board were killed as a result of the crash. One passenger lived for eleven days after the disaster but succumbed to his injuries. Most of the victims were Yugoslav citizens of Albanian ethnicity.

The crash was Macedonia's third aviation disaster in 16 months, and remains the country's deadliest. A subsequent investigation established the cause of the accident as pilot error.

== Flight ==
Flight 110 was an international scheduled passenger flight originating in Geneva, Switzerland with a final destination of Skopje, Macedonia. Due to a blizzard at Skopje, Flight 110 was diverted to Ohrid Airport.

Cleared for an approach to Runway 02, the Yak-42 was approximately 2,300 feet (700 m) too high to carry out a successful landing, so a missed approach procedure was executed. Shortly afterwards the crew of Flight 110 radioed that they were not receiving the VOR signal. Air Traffic control was unable to satisfy the request for a bearing and the pilot of Flight 110 advised that he could not see the runway lights. Shortly thereafter, Flight 110 crashed killing 115 of the 116 people on board. One passenger, a 23-year-old Serbian man, initially survived but was badly injured.

== Passengers and crew ==
Eighty percent of the passengers were citizens of Yugoslavia, mostly ethnic Albanians, while the remainder were citizens of Macedonia. The four members of the flight crew were Russian and the four cabin crew members were Macedonian. Among the passengers was a French United Nations High Commissioner for Refugees (UNHCR) official in his mid-20s who had just returned from an assignment in war-torn Bosnia and Herzegovina.

== Aftermath ==
Due to Flight 110 being the third aviation disaster in a 16-month period to take place in his country, Minister of Urban Planning, Civil Engineering, Communications and Ecology Antoni Pesev resigned. The pilots association complained of broken equipment and poor safety standards at both Skopje and Ohrid Airports.

On 1 December 1993, the initial survivor died without ever regaining consciousness.

Flight 110 remains the deadliest aviation disaster to ever take place in Macedonia.

== Cause ==
The cause of the crash was attributed to a violation of the airport traffic pattern by the crew of Flight 110, who initiated a turn into rising terrain. A contributing factor was their decision to proceed with the approach even though they were not receiving a navigational signal due to being out of range of the VOR station. In addition, the air traffic controller's transmissions were spoken in Macedonian, but the crew of the aircraft communicated in Russian and English.

== See also ==
- Palair Macedonian Airlines Flight 301, a 5 March 1993 aviation disaster in Macedonia
