= Debarca =

Region in North Macedonia

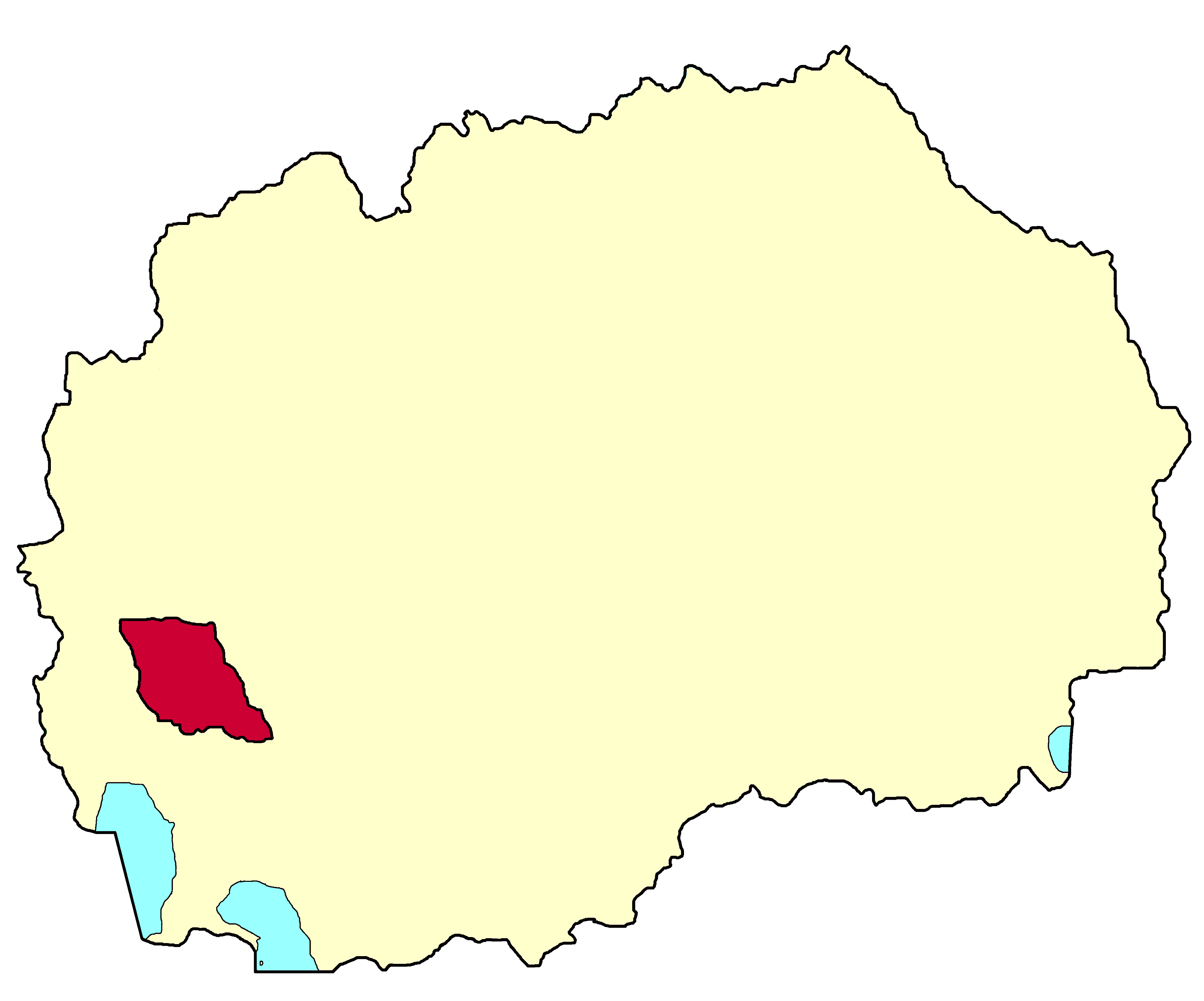
Debarca region.

Debarca or Drembica (Macedonian: Дебарца) is a historical region in western North Macedonia, north of Ohrid and south-west of Kičevo. Its territory is now divided between Debarca Municipality and Kičevo Municipality.

== History ==
A region known as Drembica, Deb'rca, or Debritsa is attested as an early medieval diocese in the region of Macedonia.

It is still debatable whether this is the Sclaveni of the Draguvites or whether the name does not refer to this South Slavic tribe around Thessaloniki. In historical sources Drembica is mentioned together with Velica.

== Notable people ==
- Trajko Veljanovski (born in Slivovo), former President of the Assembly of North Macedonia.
