= Goranci =

Goranci may refer to:

- Gorani people, an ethnic group in Kosovo
- Goranci, Mostar, a village in Bosnia and Herzegovina

== See also ==
- Gorenci (disambiguation)
