= Kuratica =

- Village
- Куратица
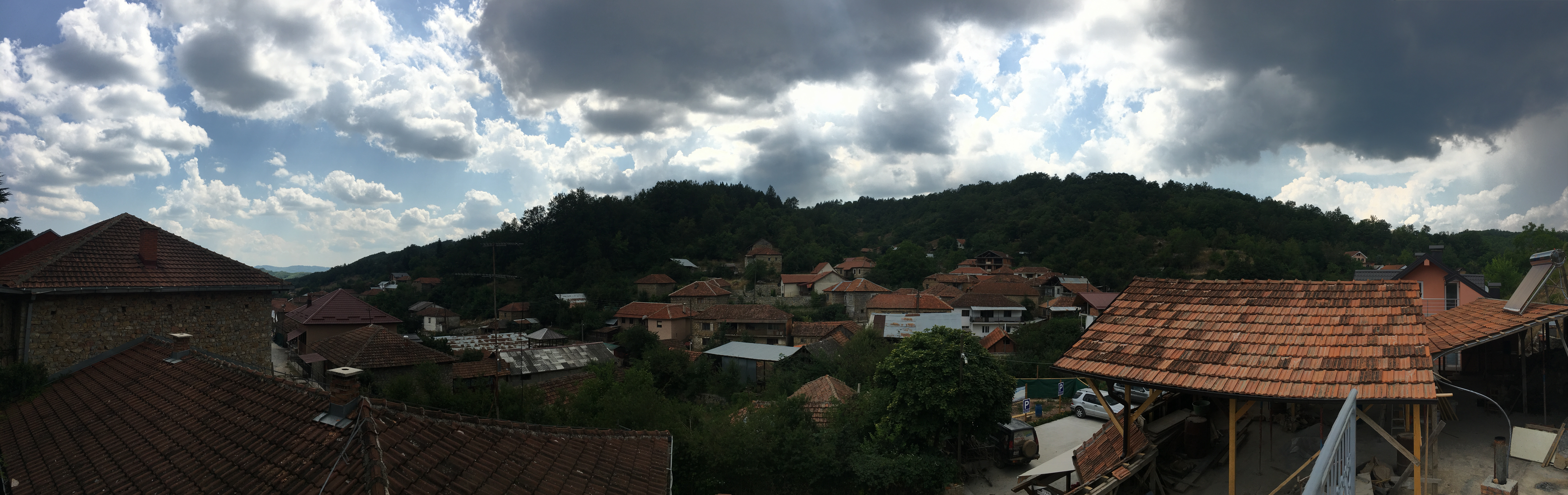
- View of the village
- Nickname: Курајца
- Location within North Macedonia
- Coordinates: 41°14′31″N 20°53′26″E
- Country: North Macedonia
- Region: Southwestern
- Municipality: Ohrid

Population (2002)
  - Total: 326
- Time zone: UTC+1 (CET)
  - Summer (DST): UTC+2 (CEST)
- Car plates: OH
- Website: .

Kuratica (Macedonian: Куратица) or slang Kurajca (Macedonian: Курајца) is a village in the municipality of Ohrid, North Macedonia. It used to be part of the former municipality of Kosel.

== Name ==
The placename Kuratica is possibly an Aromanian toponym derived from the word curát meaning clear, fast, clean alongside the suffix ica. The village is located near a fast running mountain stream.

== Demographics ==
According to the statistics of Bulgarian ethnographer Vasil Kanchov from 1900, 395 inhabitants lived in Kuratica, all Bulgarian Christians.

According to the 2002 census, the village had a total of 326 inhabitants. Ethnic groups in the village include:

- Macedonians 326

== See also ==
- Arbinovo
- Botun
- Laktinje
- Sirula
