= Sirula =

- Village
- Сирула
- Location within North Macedonia
- Coordinates: 41°14′04″N 20°50′40″E
- Country: North Macedonia
- Region: Southwestern
- Municipality: Ohrid

Population (2002)
  - Total: 10
- Time zone: UTC+1 (CET)
  - Summer (DST): UTC+2 (CEST)
- Car plates: OH
- Website: .

Sirula (Macedonian: Сирула) is a village in the municipality of Ohrid, North Macedonia. It used to be part of the former municipality of Kosel.

== Name ==
The placename Sirula<Sirulja and the possible suffix -ja stems from the name Sirul of which along with its suffix -ul is derived from an Aromanian foundation alongside sir.

== Demographics ==
According to the 2002 census, the village had a total of 10 inhabitants. Ethnic groups in the village include:

- Macedonians 10

== See also ==
- Arbinovo
- Botun
- Laktinje
- Kuratica
