= Hybrid toponym =

Toponym that consists of parts coming from different languages

A hybrid toponym, sometimes called cross-bred toponym is a toponym that consists of parts coming from different languages. Topomyms of this kind result from contacts of different cultures.

In Southwestern states of the United States, there is a considerable number of Spanish-English hybrids. Many of them were created by combining a Spanish descriptive name with an English word that specifies the type of the toponym. Common English specifiers are "Creek", "Park", "Beach", "Valley", "Springs", "River": Amargosa Valley, Pismo Beach, Codornices Creek, Poncha Springs, Del Rey Oaks. A number of American hybrid toponyms are produced by immigrant communities, which appended the qualifier "New" to a placename in their native country: New Amsterdam, New Moscow.

In some cases this leads to tautological toponyms, e.g., Ohio River, from Iroquoian "Ohio", 'Great River' plus "River".

A base name in one language may be accompanianed by a modifier 'Small", "Lower", "White"/"Black", etc. in another language. For example, the name of Ulken Ulasty combines the base ulas of Mongolian origin with Kazakh ulken, 'small'.

A type of hybrid toponyms is when a root from one language is combined with a derivational affix coming from another language: Kargaly combined Monlolian root Kagra with Kazakh adjectival suffix '-ly'.
