= Podmol =

Podmol Подмол
- Village
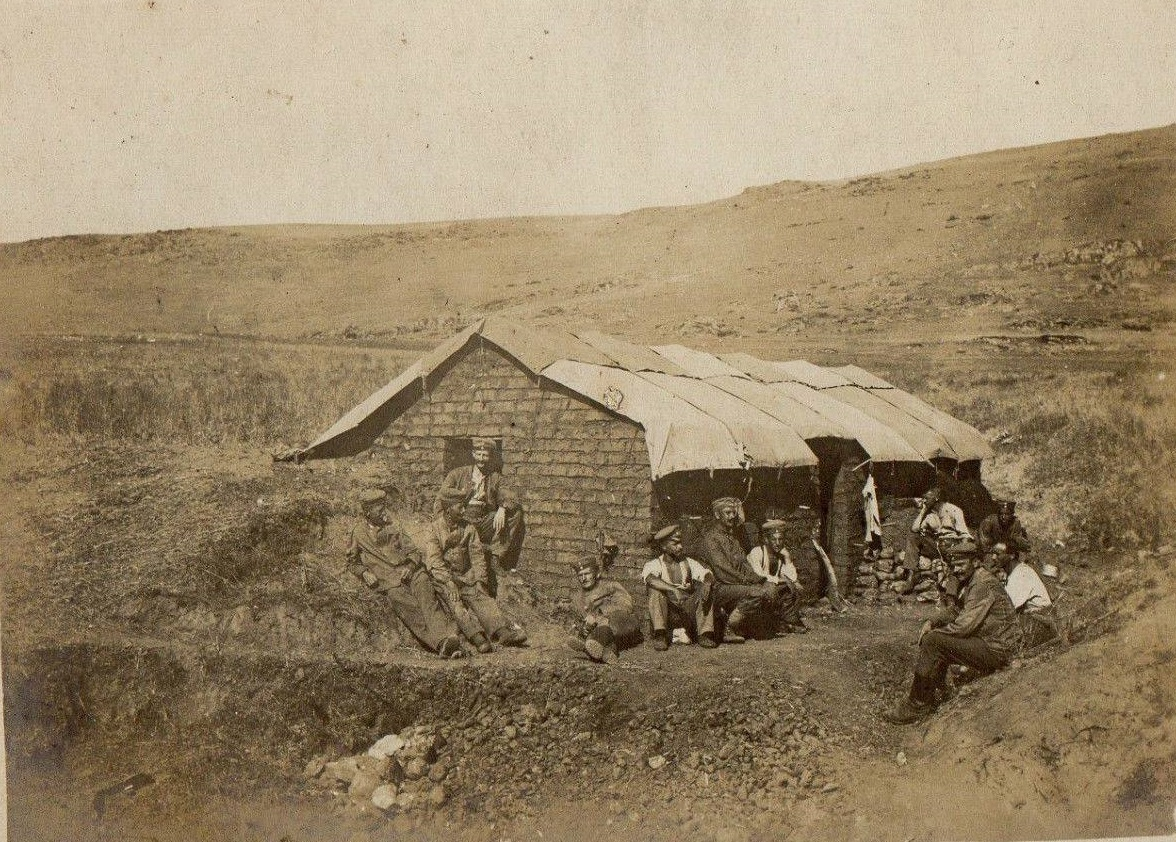

- Location within North Macedonia
- Country: North Macedonia
- Region: Pelagonia
- Municipality: Prilep
- Elevation: 690 m (2,260 ft)

Population (2002)
  - Total: 138
- Time zone: UTC+1 (CET)

Podmol (Подмол) is a village in the district of Prilep, in North Macedonia. It used to be part of the former municipality of Topolčani.

== Demographics ==
According to the 2002 census, the village had a total of 138 inhabitants. Ethnic groups in the village include:

- Macedonians 138
