= Mešeišta =

Mešeišta Мешеишта
- Village
- Location within North Macedonia
- Country: North Macedonia
- Region: Southwestern
- Municipality: Debarca

Population (2002)
  - Total: 779
- Time zone: UTC+1 (CET)
  - Summer (DST): UTC+2 (CEST)
- Website: .

Mešeišta (Macedonian: Мешеишта) is a village in the municipality of Debarca, North Macedonia. It sits on the border between the Debarca Municipality and Ohrid Municipality, but administratively belongs to the formed.

== Demographics ==
According to the 2002 census, the village had a total of 778 inhabitants. Ethnic groups in the village include:

- Macedonians 776
- Aromanians 1
- Others 2
