= Botun, North Macedonia =

Botun Ботун
- Village
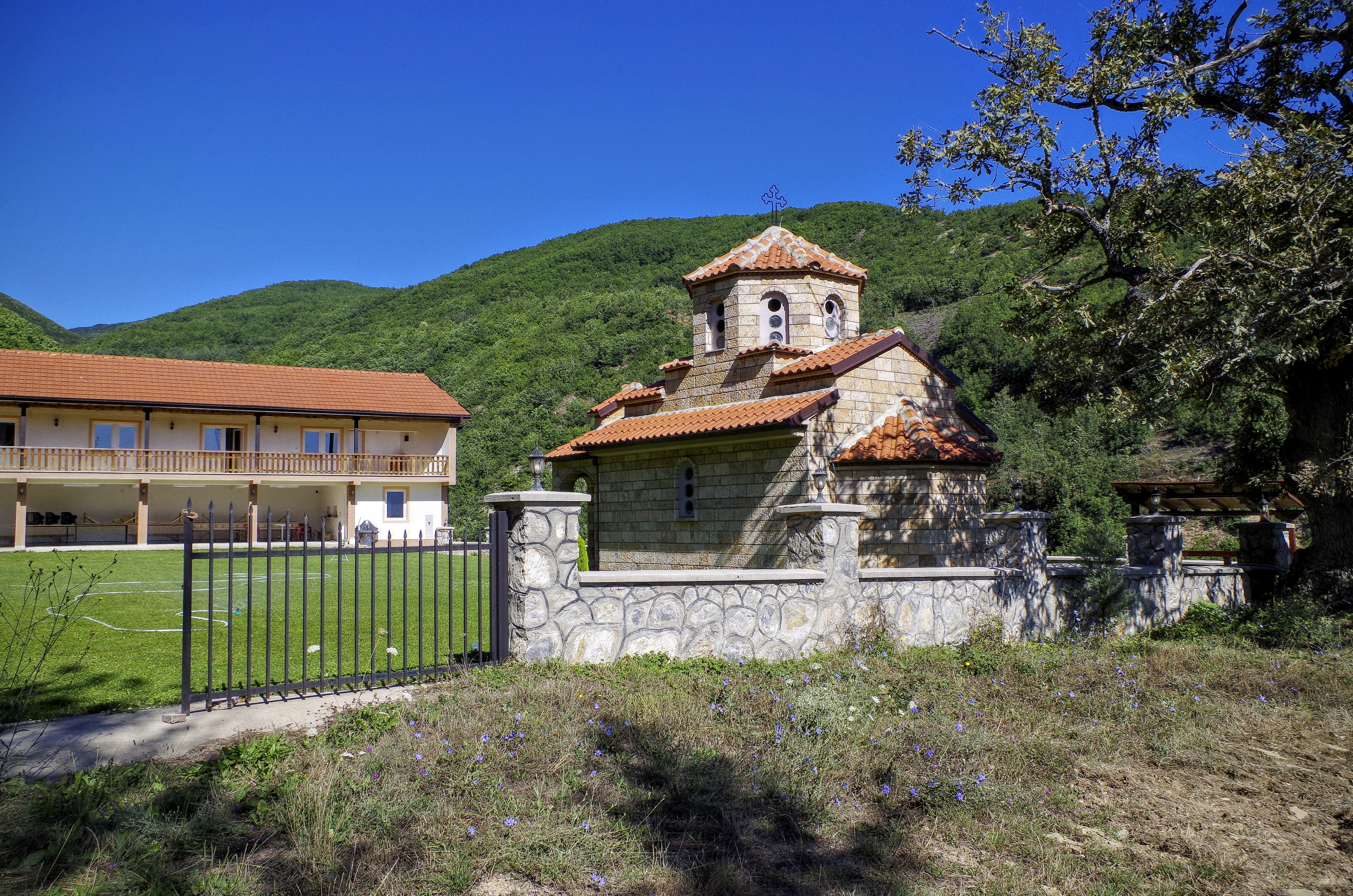
- Monastery of Botun

- Location within North Macedonia
- Coordinates: 41°17′07″N 20°47′29″E
- Country: North Macedonia
- Region: Southwestern
- Municipality: Debarca

Population (2002)
  - Total: 227
- Time zone: UTC+1 (CET)
  - Summer (DST): UTC+2 (CEST)
- Car plates: OH
- Website: .

Botun (Macedonian: Ботун) is a village in the municipality of Debarca, North Macedonia. It used to be part of the former municipality of Belčišta.

== Name ==
Bulgarian academic Georgiev derives the toponym Botun from the Romanian term buti (meaning spill or a current) and notes that in the Dicţionarul limbii romane (Romanian Dictionary) the term buti is marked as a loan from Bulgarian. Another Bulgarian academic derives the toponym Botun from the Romanian word boti (meaning wooden bucket or bucket). Botun lies on Sateska river, which forms a ravine and according to Pianka Włodzimierz the first explanation looks plausible. Pianka Włodzimierz however states that a more acceptable etymology of the village name is given by M. Moskov where Botun is derived from the Macedonian Botunja meaning fertile soil. In a similar way Włodzimierz notes that in the speech of Albanians from the nearby area of Debar the term botë exists referring to a kind of darken/ash coloured earth or land.

== Demographics ==
According to the 2002 census, the village had a total of 227 inhabitants. Ethnic groups in the village include:

- Macedonians 220
- Serbs 3
- Others 4
