= Ohrid St. Paul the Apostle Airport =

International airport in North Macedonia

Ohrid St.Paul the Apostle Airport Аеродром „Свети Апостол Павле“ Охрид

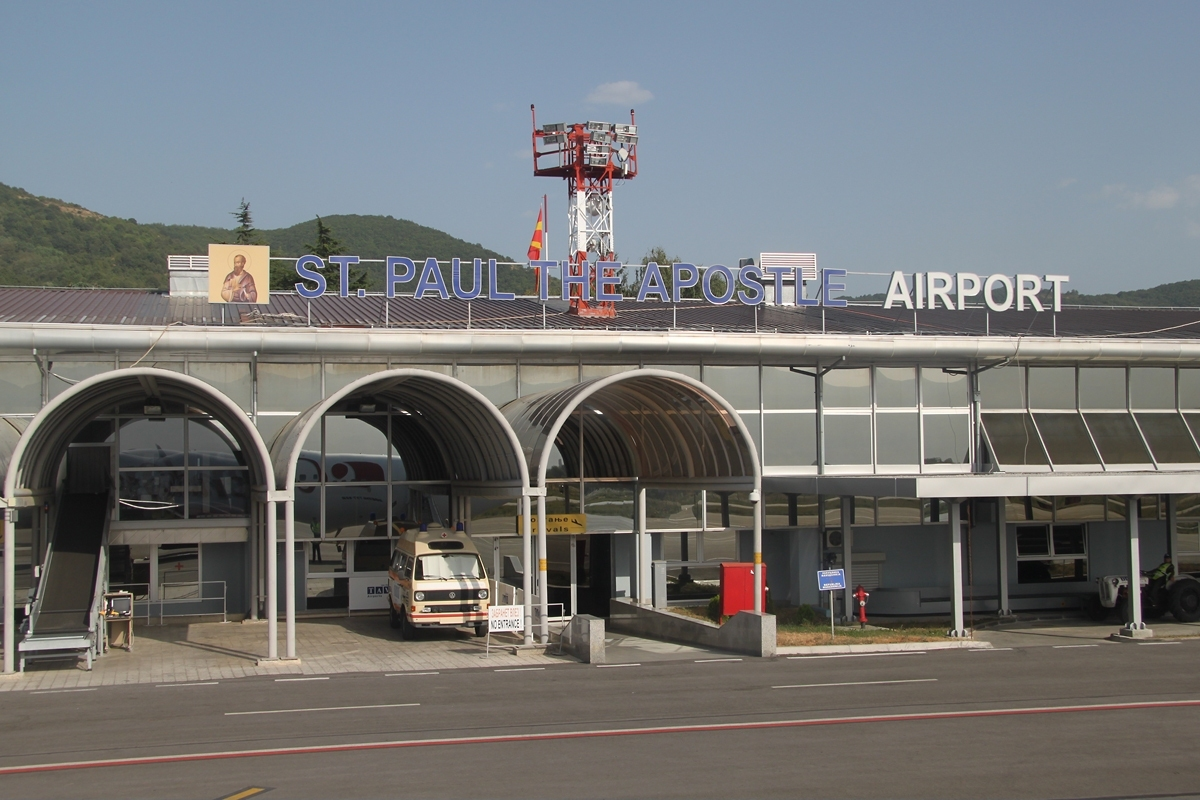
- IATA: OHD; ICAO: LWOH

Summary
- Airport type: Civil
- Operator: TAV Airports
- Serves: Ohrid, North Macedonia
- Location: Orovnik, Debarca Municipality
- Elevation AMSL: 2,313 ft (705 m)
- Coordinates: 41°10′48″N 020°44′32″E
- Website: ohd.airports.com.mk

Map
- Location within North Macedonia OHD (Europe)

Runways
Direction	Length		Surface
Direction	ft	m	Surface
01/19	8,366	2,550	Asphalt

Statistics (2023)
- Passengers: 265,896
- Passenger change 22-23: ▲14.5%
- Aircraft movements: 462
- Movements change 22-23: ▲6.0%

Ohrid St. Paul the Apostle Airport (Macedonian: Аеродром „Св. Апостол Павле“ Охрид, romanized: Aerodrom „Sv. Apostol Pavle“ Ohrid, IATA: OHD, ICAO: LWOH), also known as Ohrid Airport (Macedonian: Аеродром Охрид, romanized: Aerodrom Ohrid), is an international airport in Debarca Municipality, North Macedonia. The airport is located 9 km (5.6 mi) northwest from Ohrid. The main purpose of St. Paul the Apostle Airport is to serve as a second airport in North Macedonia and alternative to Skopje International Airport and cater to flights bringing in tourists destined for Ohrid.

== History ==
The last runway reconstruction was performed in 2004, when a lighting system, a first category with simple approach lights, was installed. Other features enable takeoff, landing and maneuvering with different types of aircraft.

In 2008, the Macedonian Government signed a contract with the Turkish company TAV Airports Holding for a twenty-year-long concession during which this company would manage Macedonia's two existing airports in Ohrid and Skopje. Ohrid airport saw its terminal building and VIP sections modernized.

== Facilities ==
The airport can accommodate small to medium-sized aircraft. The apron can park up to 9 aircraft and the terminal is equipped to handle up to 400,000 passengers annually. Among other amenities the terminal building encompasses an information desk, a restaurant, a duty-free shop, and a VIP lounge.

There is no arrivals lounge. The local public await the passengers outside the building.

== Airlines and destinations ==
The following airlines operate regular scheduled and seasonal flights at Ohrid St. Paul the Apostle Airport:

Airlines	Destinations
Air Serbia	Seasonal: Belgrade
Austrian Airlines	Seasonal: Vienna
Chair Airlines	Zürich
Edelweiss Air	Seasonal: Zürich
GP Aviation	Basel/Mulhouse
TUI Airways	Seasonal: London–Gatwick, Manchester
TUI fly Netherlands	Seasonal: Amsterdam
Turkish Airlines	Seasonal: Istanbul
Wizz Air	Basel/Mulhouse, Dortmund, Memmingen; Seasonal: Bratislava, Katowice, Milan–Malpensa, Wrocław

== Statistics ==
The number of passengers at the airport is shown in the next table:

Traffic figures at Ohrid St. Paul the Apostle Airport
Year	Passengers	Change	Aircraft movements	Change
1990	67,811	-	-	-
1991	60,440	▼10,9%	-	-
1992	34,344	▼43,2%	-	-
1993	48,022	▲39,8%	-	-
1994	18,681	▼61,1%	-	-
1995	39,270	▲110,2%	-	-
1996	104,229	▲165,4%	-	-
1997	42,544	▼59,2%	-	-
1998	55,417	▲30,3%	-	-
1999	74,497	▲34,4%	-	-
2000	65,941	▼11,5%	-	-
2001	53,954	▼18,2%	-	-
2002	60,209	▲11,6%	-	-
2003	51,082	▼15,5%	-	-
2004	32,309	▼36,8%	-	-
2005	53,901	▲66,8%	-	-
2006	50,336	▼6,6%	-	-
2007	45,515	▼9,6%	-	-
2008	44,413	▼2,4%	-	-
2009	33,873	▼23,7%	-	-
2010	14,095	▼58,4%	-	-
2011	78,246	▲455,1%	906	-
2012	84,736	▲8,3%	866	▼4,4%
2013	83,060	▼2,0%	1,069	▲23,4%
2014	69,984	▼15,7%	821	▼23,2%
2015	107,916	▲54,2%	1,133	▲38,0%
2016	145,002	▲34,5%	1,446	▲27,6%
2017	159,072	▲9,7%	1,450	▲0.3%
2018	184,283	▲15,8%	1,562	▲7.7%
2019	317,218	▲72.1%	2,623	▲67.9%
2020	72,086	▼77.3%	606	▼76.9%
2021	122,154	▲69.5%	976	▲61.1%
2022	232,232	▲90.1%	1,566	▲61.8%
2023	265,896	▲14.5%	462	▲6.0%
2024	219,916	▼17.3%	0	▲0%
2025	263,869	▲20.0%	0	▲0%

== Ground transportation ==
There are currently no buses linking the airport with Ohrid city centre. The normal taxi fare for the 9-km ride is 12 euros or 730 denars.

== Incidents and accidents ==
- On 20 November 1993, Avioimpex Flight 110, a Yak 42D crashed near the airport. The aircraft was on a flight from Geneva, Switzerland to Skopje, but had been diverted to Ohrid due to poor weather conditions. All 116 people on board the aircraft died. One passenger initially survived the crash but died from his injuries in hospital eleven days later.
