= Belčišta =

Belčišta Белчишта
- Village
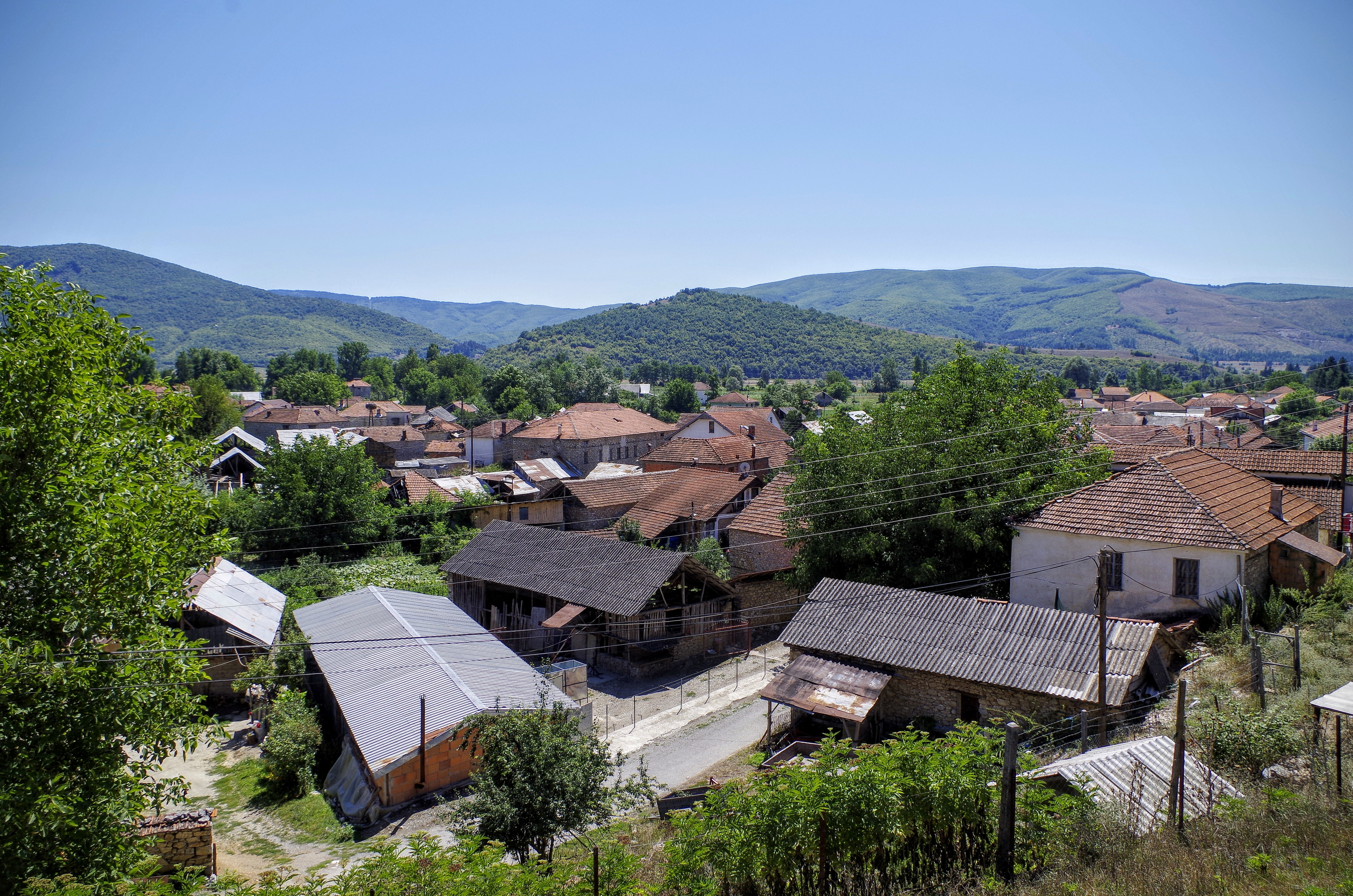
- View of Belčišta

- Location within North Macedonia
- Coordinates: 41.302757°N 20.830078°E
- Country: North Macedonia
- Region: Southwestern
- Municipality: Debarca

Population (2002)
  - Total: 437
- Time zone: UTC+1 (CET)
  - Summer (DST): UTC+2 (CEST)
- Vehicle registration: OH
- Website: .

Belčišta (Macedonian: Белчишта) is a village in the municipality of Debarca, North Macedonia. It used to be municipality of its own. It is the municipality center of Debarca municipality.

== Demographics ==
According to the 2002 census, the village had a total of 437 inhabitants. Ethnic groups in the village include:

- Macedonians 436
- Serbs 1
