= Debarca Municipality =

Municipality of North Macedonia

Coordinates: 41.5°N 21.3833°E

Debarca Municipality Општина Дебарца
- Rural municipality
- Flag Coat of arms

- Location within North Macedonia
- Country: North Macedonia
- Region: Southwestern
- Municipal seat: Belčišta

Government
  - Mayor: Zlatko Siljanoski (VMRO-DPMNE)

Area
  - Total: 425.39 km^{2} (164.24 sq mi)

Population
  - Total: 3,719
  - Density: 12.95/km^{2} (33.5/sq mi)
- Time zone: UTC+1 (CET)
- Area code: 046
- Vehicle registration: OH
- Website: Official

Debarca (Macedonian: Дебарца) is a municipality in the Southwestern Statistical Region of North Macedonia. The village of Belčišta is the municipal seat. It is the municipality in which Ohrid "St. Paul the Apostle" Airport is located, the second of two international airports in the county.

== Geography ==
The municipality borders Kičevo Municipality to the northeast, Demir Hisar Municipality to the east, Ohrid Municipality to the south, and Struga Municipality to the west.

The municipality encompasses the Debarca Valley, part of the Sateska River watershed that flows into Lake Ohrid and belongs to the Lake Ohrid Drainage Basin.

The majority of the villages are nestled between the Karaorman Mountain in the west and Ilinska Mountain in the east.

== Demographics ==
The municipality consists of 30 villages. According to the 2021 North Macedonia census, this municipality has 3,719 inhabitants.

	2002		2021	
	Number	%	Number	%
TOTAL	5,507	100	3,719	100
Macedonians	5,324	96.68	3,330	89.54
Albanians	153	2.78	59	1.59
Bosniaks			3	0.08
Turks	2	0.04	2	0.05
Serbs	8	0.15	1	0.03
Vlachs	1	0.01		
Other / Undeclared / Unknown	19	0.34	8	0.21
Persons for whom data are taken from administrative sources			316	8.5
