= Macedonians in Albania =

Ethnic group in Albania

Macedonians in Albania Maqedonasit në Shqipëri Македонци во Албанија Makedonci vo Albanija
Total population
- 2,281 (2023 census)

Regions with significant populations
- Municipalities: Kukës, Dibër, Bulqizë, Librazhd, Pogradec, Pustec, Devoll, Korçë

Languages
- Macedonian and Albanian

Religion
- Macedonian Orthodoxy and Islam

Related ethnic groups
- Other Macedonians, Bulgarians in Albania

The Macedonians in Albania (Albanian: Maqedonasit në Shqipëri; Macedonian: Македонци во Албанија, romanized: Makedonci vo Albanija) are an officially recognized ethnic minority. According to the data from the census held in 2023, there are 2,281 ethnic Macedonians in Albania. According to the 2011 census, 5,512 ethnic Macedonians lived in Albania. In the 1989 census, 4,697 people had declared themselves Macedonian.

The condition of the Macedonian population living in the Prespa area is described in positive terms, and particular praise is given since all the villages of the area are allowed schooling in their mother tongue. Macedonian organizations allege that the government undercounts their number and that they are politically under-represented, arguing there are no Macedonians in the Albanian parliament, until Vasil Sterjovski was elected in 2019 representing the Macedonian Party. Past Helsinki reports stated, "Albania recognizes [...] a Macedonian minority, but only in the Southern regions. Those who identify as Macedonians [...] outside these minority regions are denied the minority rights granted in the south, including minority classes at state schools."

In some circumstances, ethnic identity can be fluid among Albania's Slavophonic population, who may identify as Macedonian or Bulgarian, depending on the circumstances. Albanian Slavs are targeted by "Bulgarian cross-border nationalism" and, as an EU member, Bulgaria offers more benefits to this minority than North Macedonia does.

== History ==
In the middle of the 19th century, the national affiliation of the Orthodox Slavs of Macedonia became the locus of a contest between Greeks and Bulgarians, who intensified their national educational activity in the region, along with Serbia. According to Encyclopædia Britannica 1911 Edition, at the beginning of the 20th century, the Slavs constituted the majority of the population in Macedonia. Per Britannica itself, the bulk of the Slavs was regarded by almost all independent authorities as "Bulgarians". The partition of the Ottoman lands of the region of Macedonia between Balkan nation-states after the conclusion of the Balkan Wars (1912–1913) and World War I (1914–1918) left the area divided. The areas of Gollobordë and Mala Prespa were included in Albania. In 1923, during the Albanian border disputes, Bulgarian General Markov asked the Italian delegation in Durrës for informations about "Bulgarian" villages in Albania. General Enrico Tellini reported that the villages Markov had described as "Bulgarian" were in fact called "Macedonian" by the villagers themselves and that the Slavic-speaking inhabitants of the Korçë region identified as Macedonians, and when he suggested the term "Bulgarian", the villagers kept insisting on "Macedonians". He noted that, despite their proximity to Bulgarians, it was difficult to classify them as "true Bulgarians". He also noted that many of these villages were under strong Greek influence. The Albanians referred to Slavic Macedonians in Albania as Bulgarians (estimated as 27,000 by the Macedonian National Committee in Sofia in the 1930s). The new Albanian state did not attempt to assimilate this minority. On January 9, 1932, the Bulgarian and Albanian delegations signed in Sofia a protocol regarding the recognition of the ethnic Bulgarian minority in Albania. Yugoslavia was suspicious of the recognition of a Bulgarian minority in Macedonia and was concerned this would hinder its policy of forced Serbianisation in Serbian Macedonia. It had already blocked the ratification of such protocol with Greece. Due to pressure from Yugoslavia, this protocol was also never ratified. However, in 1942 the Albanian-Italian census in today's western parts of North Macedonia, then part of the Albanian Kingdom, and today most eastern parts of Albania, was conducted for the ethnic composition of its Slavic population, that 31% from registered were Bulgarians and 8% were recorded as Serbs.

On the other hand, in 1934 the Comintern gave its support to the idea that the Macedonian Slavs constituted a separate nationality. Prior to the Second World War, this view on the Macedonian issue had no practical importance. During the war, these ideas were supported by the pro-Yugoslav Macedonian communist partisans. After the Red Army entered the Balkans, new communist regimes came into power in the area. In this way, their policy on the Macedonian Question was to support the development of a distinct ethnic Macedonian identity. As a result, the Slavic minority in Albania was recognized in 1945 as Macedonian. The former Prime Minister Aleksander Meksi openly admitted the presence of ethnic Bulgarians near the Lake Prespa in 1993. After the fall of communism, in 1998, many Macedonians from Mala Prespa and Golo Brdo illegally crossed to the Republic of Macedonia. The then foreign minister of Albania Paskal Milo, has stated on the Slav minority issue: "After World War II, we know this minority as Macedonian. I’d rather not elaborate on why we chose this way, but the Communist regime made this decision and it’s difficult for us now to change that." At the request of Bulgarian MEPs, the European Parliament Committee on Foreign Affairs brought up the issue of people with Bulgarian ethnicity that are located in the Prespa, Gollobordë and Gora regions. Following pressure from Bulgarian MEPs and petition from the local Bulgarian community, in 2017 the Albanian parliament recognized a Bulgarian minority in Albania. Its presence is supported by field researchers from Bulgaria, but is disputed by ethnic Macedonian activists there. According to Edmond Temelko, former mayor of the Pustec Municipality, "[...] Bulgaria uses heavy economic situation of Macedonians in Albania to offer them Bulgarian citizenship, passports and employment opportunity". According to the data from the census held in 2023, the number of Bulgarians was three times more than that of Macedonians, and that caused protests from the Macedonian side.

== Population ==
External estimates on the population of Macedonians in Albania include 10,000, whereas Macedonian sources have claimed 120,000 to 350,000 Macedonians in Albania.

Year	Macedonian population	% change
1950	2,273	–
1955	3,341	+47.0%
1960	4,235	+26.8%
1979	4,097	−3.3%
1989	4,697	+14.7%
2011	5,512	+17.4%
2023	2,281	-58.4%

In 2000, Albania conducted a census which did not record ethnic affiliation and as such during that time resulted in various estimates for the Slavic population of Albania that could not be checked and rectified. The then Macedonian immigration minister Martin Trenevski claimed in 2000 that the Macedonian minority in Albania numbered 300,000. After conducting personal visits to areas of Macedonian settlement in Albania, diplomat Geert Ahrens considered these numbers "grossly exaggerated", as did other Macedonian interlocutors.

In March 2009, the Commission for Minority Issues of the Foreign Ministry of Albania announced the results of its study about the national minorities in the country. According to the study, there are 4,148 Macedonians (0.14% of the total population) living in the country. The ethnic Macedonian organisations of Albania announced they will complain at Albanian institutions and international organisations.

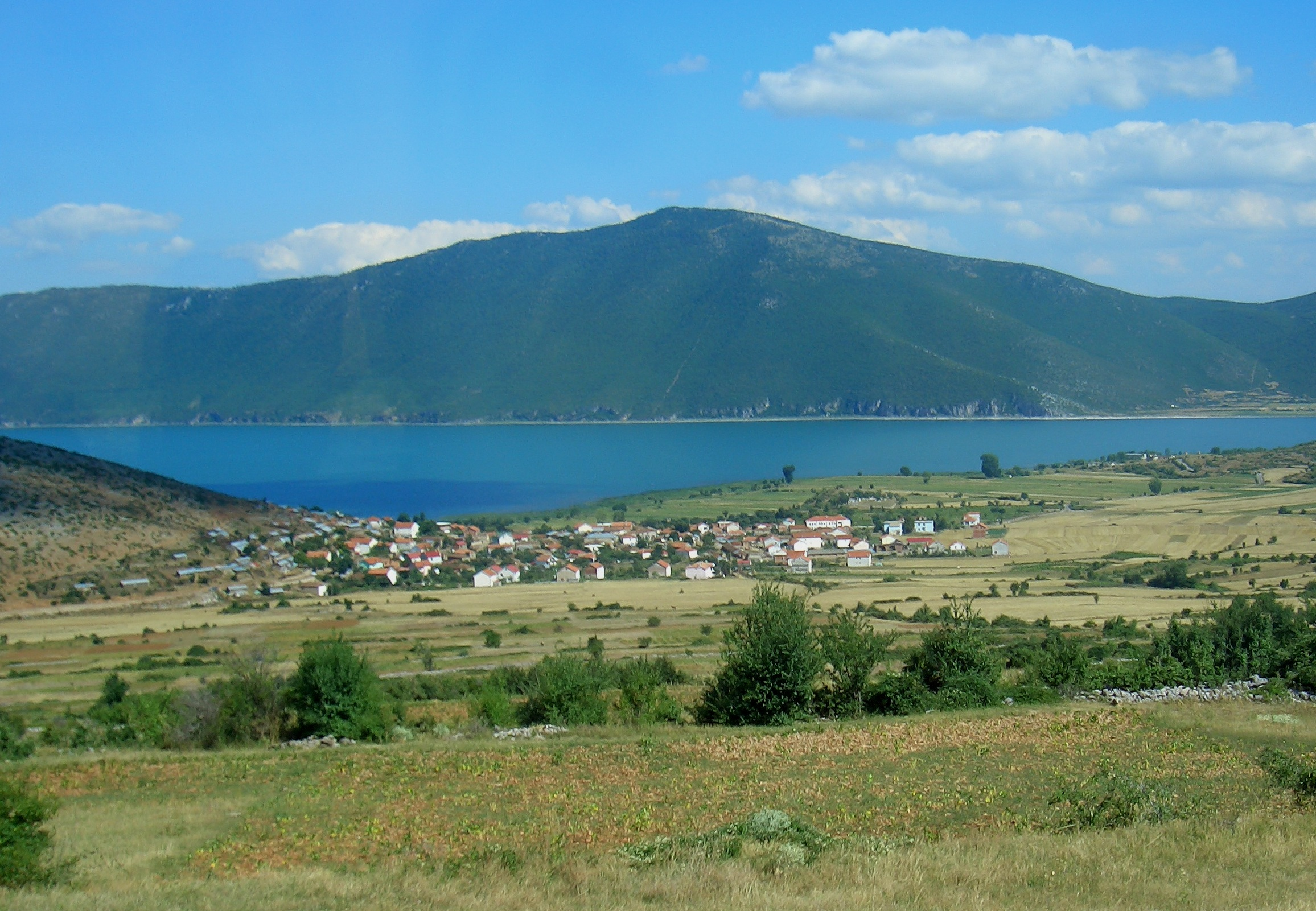
Pustec is one of the biggest settlements populated with Macedonians

Ethnic Macedonian and Greek organizations, such as the Macedonian Party and Omonooa, believed the Albanian government had stated that it would jail anyone who did not participate in the census of 2011 or refused to declare their ethnicity.

The complication of counting the Macedonian minority in Albania in the 2000s was due to most Macedonian speakers being from a Muslim background with tendencies of not identifying as Macedonians, as even in Macedonia, Muslim Macedonian speakers were not in instances counted as Macedonians but as Torbeši or Gorani. As such Ahrens stated that the overall estimate of the Slavic population of Albania ranged between 10,000 and 20,000 people. The 2023 census recorded 2,281 Macedonians.

=== Geographic distribution ===
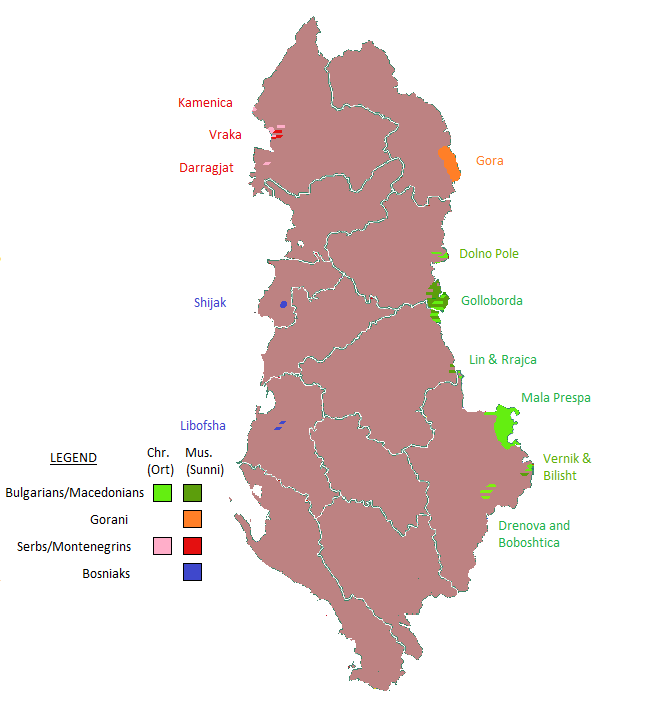
Historical location of Slavic groups that inhabited Albania in the early 20th century.

Macedonians in Albania traditionally live in Pustec Municipality (Macedonian: Мала Преспа/Mala Prespa), Gollobordë (Macedonian: Голо Брдо/Golo Brdo), Dibër District (Macedonian: Дебар Поле/Debar Pole), Korçë (Macedonian: Горица/Gorica), Pogradec (Macedonian: Поградец) and Gora (Macedonian: Гора) areas. Some, however, have moved to larger cities like Tirana, where roughly 500 ethnic Macedonians live as of the 2011 census.

==== Pustec Municipality (Mala Prespa) ====
Macedonians are only officially recognised as a minority population in Municipality of Pustec, on the shores of Lake Prespa. The municipality consists of the following villages:

- Cerje (Macedonian: Церје)
- Dollna Goricë (Macedonian: Долна Горица)
- Glloboçen (Macedonian: Глобочани)
- Gorna Goricë (Macedonian: Горна Горица)
- Leskë (Macedonian: Леска)
- Pustec (Macedonian: Пустец)
- Shulin (Macedonian: Шулин)
- Tuminec (Macedonian: Туминец)
- Zërnovskë (Macedonian: Зрновско)

==== Devoll ====
Macedonians also inhabit the region to the south of Lake Prespa, within the Devoll municipality. A Macedonian minority can be found in the village of Vërnik (Macedonian: Врбник/Vrbnik), which is the only Macedonian-inhabited village in Albania considered in Macedonian sources to form a part of Aegean Macedonia. Historically the village of Rakickë (Macedonian: Ракитско/Rakitsko) was a mixed village in 1900 whose population consisted of 360 Albanians and 300 Orthodox Macedonians, though by the 1970s had become a wholly Albanian inhabited village.

==== Korçë region ====
Two traditionally Orthodox Slavic speaking villages of the Korçë region existed until the 1960s when ethnic and linguistic changes occurred resulting in part of the Slavic population moving away while those remaining became assimilated. Drenovë (Macedonian: Дреново/Drenovo) has become inhabited by Orthodox Albanians and Aromanians with the last person speaking a Slavic language passing away in the 2000s and Boboshticë (Macedonian: Бобоштица/Boboštica) has become mainly inhabited by Aromanians with only a few remnants left of its former Slavic speaking population. In the 2010s, only one elderly women remains in Boboshticë who is a speaker of the village local Macedonian dialect called Kajnas (of us). The Gorica dialect of Macedonian is used by the Macedonian inhabitants of this region.

==== Lake Ohrid region ====
Macedonians can be found in the village of Lin (Macedonian: Лин), living alongside Muslim Albanians. The Macedonians of Lin speak Vevčani-Radožda dialect of Macedonian. Linguists Klaus Steinke and Xhelal Ylli conducted fieldwork in the village and noted it to be a mixed village of Orthodox Christians and Muslims having 1680 inhabitants and 296 families. Local Lin villagers stated that few families speak Macedonian, such as in instances of marriage with women from neighbouring Radožda in the Republic of Macedonia, however, Macedonian overall is not used by the third generation.

==== Gollobordë ====
In the late 1990s, Macedonian linguist Božidar Vidoeski conducted a study on the Macedonian speaking population of Albania. During that time, he notes the existence of an Orthodox Macedonian population in the Gollobordë region. Together with the Torbeŝ, Orthodox Macedonians lived in the villages of Sebisht, Pasinkë, Ostren i Madh, Ostren i Vogël, and Trebisht. He noted that the Albanian population numerically dominated in all the aforementioned villages, with the exception of Trebisht.

Trebisht administrative unit: Gjinovec (Macedonian: Гиновец/Ginovec or Гинеец/Gineec) and Klenjë (Macedonian: Клење) are inhabited solely by a Slavic speaking population which contain Torbeši. Vërnicë (Macedonian: Врница/Vrnica) is inhabited by an Albanian population that dominates demographically in the village that also contains a significant population of Torbeš and Orthodox Macedonians. Trebisht (Macedonian: Требишта/Trebišta) is traditionally inhabited by a mixed Slavic Orthodox Christian Macedonian and Torbeš population.

Ostren administrative unit: Lejçan (Macedonian: Лешничани/Lešničani), Lladomericë (Macedonian: Владимирица/Vladimirica) and Tuçep (Macedonian: Тучепи/Tučepi) are inhabited solely by Torbeš; Radovesh (Macedonian: Радовешта/Radovešta), Kojavec (Macedonian: Којовец/Kojovec), Orzhanovë (Macedonian: Оржаново/Oržanovo) are inhabited solely by a Slavic speaking population which contain Torbeš. Okshtun i Madh, Okshtun i Vogël and Tërbaç (Macedonian: Тербачиште/Terbačište) have some Torbeš residing there while Pasinkë (Macedonian: Пасинки/Pasinki), Ostren i Madh(Macedonian: Големо Острени/Golemo Ostreni) and Ostren i Vogël (Macedonian: Мало Острени/Malo Ostreni) are inhabited by an Albanian population that dominates demographically in the villages that also contain significant populations of Torbeš and Orthodox Macedonians.

Stëblevë administrative unit: Steblevë (Macedonian: Стеблево/Steblevo or Стебљево/Stebljevo) is inhabited solely by a Slavic speaking population that contains Torbeši. Sebisht (Macedonian: Себишта/Sebišta) is inhabited by an Albanian population that dominates demographically in the village and contains three families from the Torbeš and Orthodox Macedonian population.

Gjoricë administrative unit: Lubalesh (Macedonian: Љубалеш/Ljubalesh) has some Torbeš living in the village.

The Orthodox Macedonian population of Gollobordë are speakers of a south Slavic language (Macedonian). The Muslim Macedonian-speaking community of the area is known as Gollobordas and in Albania people from the community are considered Albanians instead of Macedonians, even by the Albanian state, and they are known to intermarry with Muslim Albanians and not with Orthodox Macedonians. Until the 1990s the local Orthodox Macedonian minority, who have since largely migrated, used to live in some villages alongside the Gollobordas of whom in the 2010s number some roughly 3,000 people.

==== Fusha e Shehërit ====
The area Fusha e Shehërit (valley of the city) is known in Macedonian sources as Dolno Pole (Macedonian: Долно Поле, "southern valley") is situated south of the town of Peshkopi. Historically in the early 20th century, an Orthodox Slavic speaking population was found living alongside Muslim Albanians in the villages of Dovolan - minority, Herebel - majority, Kërçishti i Epërm - majority, Maqellarë - minority, and Katund i Vogël - minority. Toward the end of the 1920s the Orthodox Slavic speaking population was located in only two villages Herebel and Kërçisht i Epërm while in the 1930s the population decline of Orthodox Slavophones continued.

During the 2000s linguists Klaus Steinke and Xhelal Ylli seeking to corroborate villages cited in past literature as being Slavic speaking carried out fieldwork in villages of the area. In Herebel only 6 Orthodox Slavic speaking families made up of 3 larger households of around 20 individuals each remain. In Kërçisht i Epërm the village contains 200 inhabitants and 45 households, of which 6 are Orthodox families with a total of 17 individuals. On the eve of the collapse of communism in 1991, Kërçisht i Epërm had 110 households with 27 belonging to the Orthodox community.

Use of the Macedonian language in Kërçisht i Epërm is limited and facing extinction, due to usage being confined to the family. Albanian is also used in family settings especially by younger generations who have limited knowledge of Macedonian due to Albanian school influences and the demographic decline of the Slavic-speaking population in the village. Linguists Steinke and Ylli also noted that unlike the Gollobordë region, the villages of the Maqellarë administrative unit area do not have any Muslim Slavic speaking inhabitants, and the village of Katund i Vogël no longer has any Slavic Christians left and is inhabited only by Albanians.

==== Gora ====
Within the Gorani community there is a recognition of their dialects being closer to the Macedonian language, than to Serbian. Sources from the Republic of Macedonia claim the Gorani people to be a subgroup of ethnic Macedonians. In the 2011 census, 11.7% of residents in Zapod and 7.7% in Shishtavec identified as ethnic Macedonians.

== Education ==
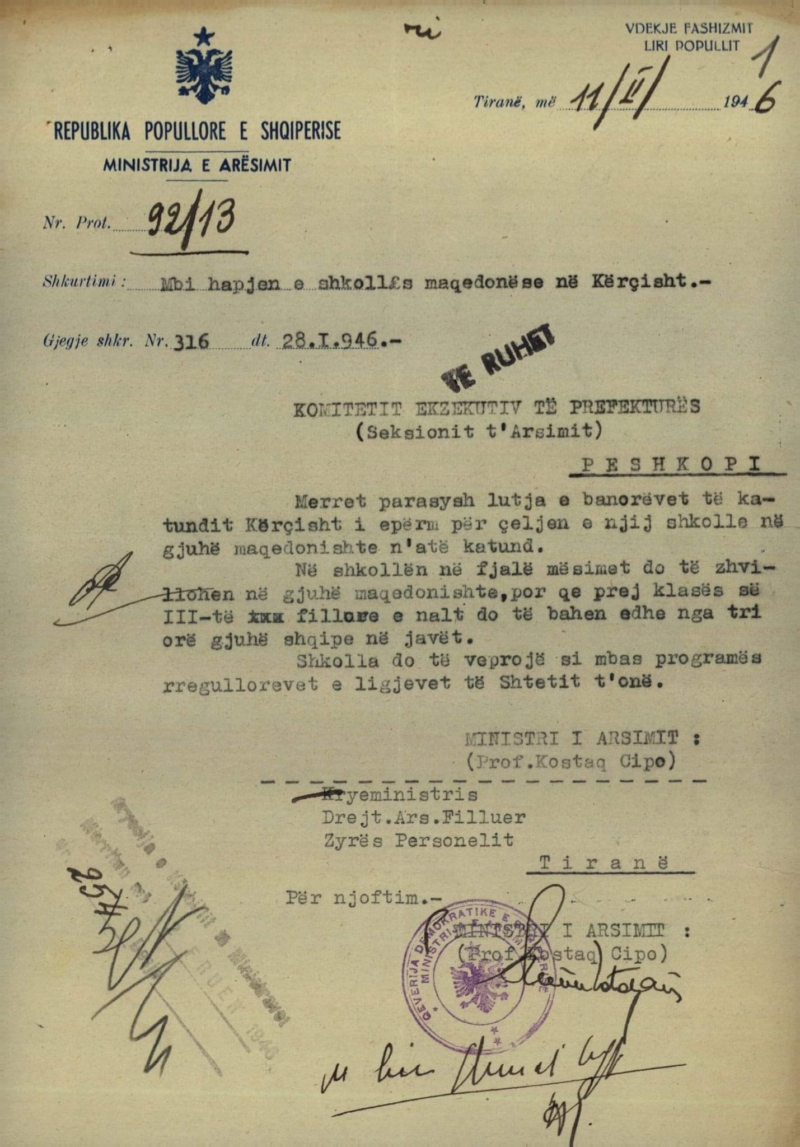
1946 document signed by the Minister of Education stating the request of the residents of Kërçisht i Sipërm to have the school teach in Macedonian language

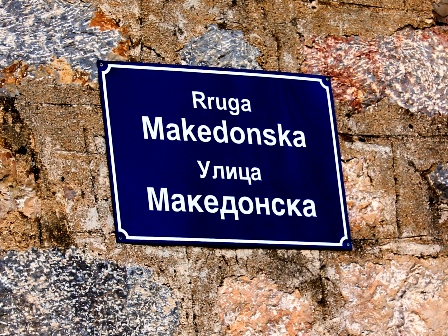
Bilingual road sign in Pustec written in both Albanian (top) and Macedonian (bottom)

There is a general high school in Pustec, one eight-year school in Dolna Goricë and six elementary schools in Shulin, Leskë, Zërnovskë, Dolna Goricë, Tuminec and Glloboçen. There are eight-year schools at the two biggest villages of the commune, Pustec and Goricë e Madhe, where 20 percent of the texts are held at the mother tongue language. At the centre of the commune there is a high school as well. The history of the Macedonian people is a special subject at the school. All minority schools have twin partnerships with counterparts in Macedonia. All the teaching personnel is local and with the proper education.

In 2023, the Macedonian language began to be taught at the pedagogical college of Korçë and a lectorate in Macedonian was re-opened at the University of Tirana.

== Culture ==
On May 10, 2026, a ceremony was held in Tuminec where a monument was unveiled honoring local Macedonians who fought in partisan units during World War II. The ceremony was attended by local Macedonians and the Prime Minister of North Macedonia Hristijan Mickoski. Although the monument is dedicated to communist partisans, it depicts the Star of Vergina, which Bulgarian media described as provocation against Albania and Greece, and a violation of the Prespa Agreement.

=== Religion ===
The relationship between the Prespa region in Albania and the Prespa-Pelagonia Diocese of the Macedonian Orthodox Church has been re-established since the 1990s. In 1995, Metropolitan Peter reconsecrated the Church of Saint George in Glloboçen, with funds for its re-construction coming from the Republic of Macedonia, Canada, and Switzerland.

The Church 'St. Michael the Archangel' was started in the early 2000s. A new church is that of Saint Mary for which a considerable funding has been given by the Macedonian Orthodox Church.

== Organizations ==
In September 1991 the "Bratska" Political Association of Macedonian in Albania (BPAMA) was established. Other Macedonian organizations include Macedonian Alliance for European Integration, Macedonian Society Ilinden Tirana, Prespa, Mir (Peace), Bratstvo (Brotherhood) and the MED (Macedonian Aegean Society).

In March 2012, Macedonians in Gollobordë formed "Most" (Macedonian for "Bridge"). The organisation's president, Besnik Hasani said that the group's goal is to "be fighting for recognition of Macedonians in Gollobordë by the Albanian state and the introduction of the Macedonian language in schools... Also, our task will be to prevent the Bulgarian propaganda and efforts of Bulgaria for the Bulgarisation of the Macedonians in Gollobordë ."

In September 2025, Macedonians from Albania formed the association "VMRO-DPMNE–Albania" aiming to "unite all Macedonians in Albania regardless of their place, role or political affiliation".

=== Political parties ===
Emblem of the Municipality of Pustec

The Macedonians in Albanian are represented by the Macedonian Alliance for European Integration (Macedonian: Македонска Алијанса за Европска Интеграција/Makedonska Alijansa za Evropska Integracija). In 2007 Edmond Temelko was elected to the position of Mayor of Pustec, and was reelected to this position in 2011, in which the party received ~2,500 votes. Edmond Osmani narrowly missed out being elected as Mayor of Trebisht, however 5 Macedonian counsellors were elected in Pustec, 3 in Trebisht, 2 in Bilisht and another in Pirg.

At present there is one Macedonian in the Albanian Parliament. But many of the local government representatives are Macedonian. The mayor of Pustec Municipality is Pali Kolefski according to 2019 local elections. He is a Macedonian. There are Macedonians represented in the districts of Zvezdë and Gorna Goricë. Following the 2023 local elections, three of the 24 members of the Korçë County council are ethnic Macedonians.

=== Media ===
==== Radio ====
The local radio of Korçë broadcasts the Fote Nikola (Macedonian: Фоте Никола) program which comprises news bulletins and songs in Macedonian for the Macedonian minority in Albania for half an hour each day. On November 7, 2002, the first private Macedonian-language radio station was set up. It is known as "Radio Prespa".

==== Television ====
The local TV station has also released programs from the Republic of Macedonia. In November, 2010, the first Macedonian television station, Television Kristal (Macedonian: Телевизија Кристал/Televisija Kristal), was officially launched.

==== Print media ====
Numerous forms of Macedonian language print media serve the needs of the Macedonians living in Albania. In the early 1990s the first Macedonian language periodical known as Mir (Peace) emerged. Later still the newspaper Prespa (Macedonian: Преспа/Prespa), began to be published by Macedonians living in the Mala Prespa region. The Macedonian newspaper 'Ilinden' was launched in April, 2011, by Macedonians living in Tirana.

== Notable individuals ==
- Nikola Berovski (1923–2013), educator and translator
- Stefan Cvetkovski (1919–1944), Macedonian Yugoslav partisan
- Elmaz Dokle (1939–2016), publicist and activist
- Kimet Fetahu (born 1955), academic and activist
- Vlado Makelarski (1919–1993), partisan
- Spase Mazenkovski (1953–2018), writer and journalist
- Cvetan Mazniku (1938–2015), activist and folklorist
- Sotir Risto (born 1974), poet
- Sterjo Spasse (1914–1989), writer
- Edmond Temelko (born 1972), former mayor of the Pustec Municipality, and ethnic Macedonian rights activist

== See also ==
- Albania–North Macedonia relations
- Macedonian diaspora
- Ethnic groups in Albania
- Albanians in North Macedonia
- Bulgarians in Albania
