= Korçë District =

Defunct (2000) Albanian administrative area

Korçë District Rrethi i Korçës
- Former district
- Coordinates: 40°39′N 20°39′E
- Country: Albania
- Dissolved: 2000
- Seat: Korçë

Area
  - Total: 1,752 km^{2} (676 sq mi)

Population (2001)
  - Total: 143,499
  - Density: 81.91/km^{2} (212.1/sq mi)
- Time zone: UTC+1 (CET)
  - Summer (DST): UTC+2 (CEST)

Korçë District (Albanian: Rrethi i Korçës) was one of the 36 districts of Albania, which were dissolved in July 2000 and replaced by 12 counties. It had a population of 143,499 in 2001, and an area of 1,752 km^{2} (676 sq mi). Its capital was the city of Korçë. Its territory is now part of Korçë County: the municipalities of Korçë, Maliq and Pustec.

Korçë District was considered one of two main minority regions of the country's south. During World War I the French created the Republic of Korça in the area.

== Geography ==
It had an area of 1,752 km^{2} (676 sq mi), making it the largest district in Albania. It was situated in the southeastern part of Albania, from lat. 40°27'N to lat. 40°57'N and from long. 21°4'E to 20°19'E.

It was bordered by Pogradec District to the north, by Greece with the Florina regional unit (Greek Macedonia) to the east, Devoll District to the southeast, by Kolonjë District and Përmet District to the southwest, and by Gramsh District and Skrapar District on the west.

== History ==
=== 19th century ===
Yuriy Venelin (1802–1839) a Russian scholar who specialised in Bulgarian studies noted that the Korçë District in 1833 (at which point its boundaries were quite different from the modern district, including all of Devoll and various other differences) had 50 villages with two thirds being Muslim and a third being Christian. Settlements of significance during that time were Moscopole, Vithkuq, Kamenicë, Floq, Boboshticë, Drenovë, Borje, Voskop and so on. Houses of the area numbered a total of 2400 containing some 22,000 people according to the Ottoman census. The Muslims and Christians of the region were noted as being "Albanians by nationality — speaking the same language, having the same customs" involved in agricultural employment, many unskilled and illiterate apart from those in Korçë and Moscopole that conduct trade. The villagers of Moscopole were mainly Aromanians in addition to Greeks and Albanians, while some Bulgarians living nearby.

=== 20th century ===
In the 1908 statistics of Amadore Virgili as presented by Nicholas Cassavetes for the Pan-Epirotic Union of Northern Epirus showed the entire kaza of Korçë, which also included surrounding rural areas as well as the modern Devoll District as having a Muslim majority which was not differentiated by nationality alongside a Christian minority of which there were 43,800 Albanian speakers and 1,214 Aromanians (Vlachs), with no Greek speakers found, while Bulgarians were not counted for. For the same area, the 1913 statistics of Destani, which did not differentiate subjects by faith but only language, found 89829 Albanian speakers, 3190 Aromanian speakers, 3985 Bulgarian speakers, no Greek speakers and 527 "others". With regard to the Aromanian population, Lambros Psomas argues the study of Virgili likely undercounted the Aromanian speakers while the study of Destani is more reliable with regard to the Aromanians but he also argues the study of Destani was pro-Albanian in motive and drastically undercounted the number of Greek speakers in the Himara and Leskovik kazas, while Psomas also excludes Korçë from the collection of regions with notable Greek-speaking presence. British historian Tom Winnifrith states that during the delineation of the Greek-Albanian border a part of the local pro-Greek element included communities whose native speech was Greek.

In 1919, US diplomat Joseph Emerson Haven on special detail in Albania wrote a detailed report regarding the political circumstances in the country. Haven wrote that the province of Korçë numbered some 60,000 people of whom 18% had a preference for union with Greece and within that group half were doing so from fear or from being promised financial gain through attainment of Muslim properties and land. Haven also noted that in 1919 there was a degree of antipathy shown by both Muslims and Christians in the district toward Greece, and an ethnic affinity among Albanians that, at the time, came before religious affinity. At the Peace Conference in Paris, the Greek delegation argued that all Christians in North Epirus, including those that spoke Albanian, should be classified as Greeks because, they argued, their sentiments were Greek, and they had a common religion with Greeks; Lambros Psomas, however, argued that this did not apply in Korçë kaza, where there were many Orthodox Albanian nationalists.

== Demographics ==
=== Ethnicity ===
According to the 2011 Albanian census most of the population of the district of Korçë are ethnic Albanians, while a significant number of ethnic minorities such as Aromanians and Greeks also inhabit the district. Nowadays, Aromanians are found mainly residing in rural communities surrounding Korçë and according to the Albanian government census number some 5,000 people.

In 2002 it was reported that Greek-speakers were also present in the city of Korçë and in the area surrounding it. A Slavic minority most concentrated in the municipality of Pustec also exists, as does a scattered presence of Romani people.

=== Religion ===
The largest religions in the district of Korçë are Orthodox Christianity and Islam. The Muslims are mainly Albanians and are divided between Sunni, Bektashi and Halveti groups. The Orthodox Christians are mainly Ethnic Albanian Orthodox Christians, Orthodox Albanians, and Aromanians. Additionally, among the Christians, there is a presence of Protestants, dating back to the actions of Gjerasim Qiriazi. Finally, a presence of Catholics was detected in the 2011 census.

== Economy ==
During the 20th century, Korçë gained a substantial industrial capacity in addition to its historic role as a commercial and agricultural centre. The plateau on which the city stands is highly fertile and is one of Albania's main wheat-growing areas. Local industries include the manufacture of knitwear, rugs, textiles, flour-milling, brewing, and sugar-refining. Deposits of lignite coal are mined in the mountains nearby such as Mborje-Drenovë. The city is home to the nationally famous Birra Korça.

== Administrative divisions ==
The district consisted of the following municipalities:

- Drenovë
- Gorë
- Korçë
- Lekas
- Libonik
- Maliq
- Moglicë
- Mollaj
- Pirg
- Pojan
- Pustec (Liqenas)
- Qendër Bulgarec
- Vithkuq
- Voskop
- Voskopojë
- Vreshtaz

== Other communities and settlements ==
- Baban
- Bickë
- Boboshticë
- Burim
- Cerja
- Dardhë
- Diellas
- Drenovë
- Cangonj
- Ekmeçi
- Floq
- Gollomboç
- Goricë e Madhë
- Goricë e Vogël
- Kallamas
- Kamenicë
- Kapshticë
- Kozeli
- Kreshpanj
- Lajthizë
- Mançurisht
- Pilur
- Plasë
- Progër
- Pustec
- Rakickë
- Shtyllë
- Sinicë
- Vreshtas
- Vranisht
- Zaroshkë
- Zëmblak
- Zvezdë

== Notable residents ==
- Pellumb Kulla (born 1940), diplomat and author
- Ibrahim Agha Father of Muhammad Ali Pasha
- Mustafa Naili Pasha (1798-1871) Born in Pojan near Zëmblak, Ottoman statesmen who held the title of Grand Vizier twice.
