= Glloboçen =

Glloboçen Globočeni Gollomboç Глобочени
- Village
- Location within Albania
- Coordinates: 40°51′22″N 20°56′43″E
- Country: Albania
- County: Korçë
- Municipality: Pustec
- Administrative unit: Pustec
- Elevation: 879 m (2,884 ft)

Population (2000)
  - Total: 294
- Time zone: UTC+1 (CET)
  - Summer (DST): UTC+2 (CEST)

Glloboçen (Albanian: Glloboçen, formerly Gollomboç; Macedonian and Bulgarian: Глобочени) is a village on Lake Prespa in the Pustec Municipality located in the Korçë County in Albania.

== Geography ==
Glloboçeni is situated on the western shore of the Greater Prespa Lake at an altitude of 879 meters (2884 feet) above sea level. The nearest settlement to the north is Dolna Gorica and to the south is Šulin.

== History ==
The "La Macédoine et sa Population Chrétienne" survey by Dimitar Mishev (D. Brankov) from 1905 shows that the inhabitants of the village of Glubochani were in the bosom of the Patriarchate of Constantinople.

A survey by Georgi Trajchev in 1911 stated the village as having 33 houses and 319 residents.

The French linguist André Mazon, in his study on Slavic folklore in Albania from 1936, noted Glomboč as a Bulgarian village in the region of Mala Prespa.

During World War II, 24 of the village's 40 houses were burnt down.

In 2013, the village's official name was changed back from Gollomboç to Glloboçeni.

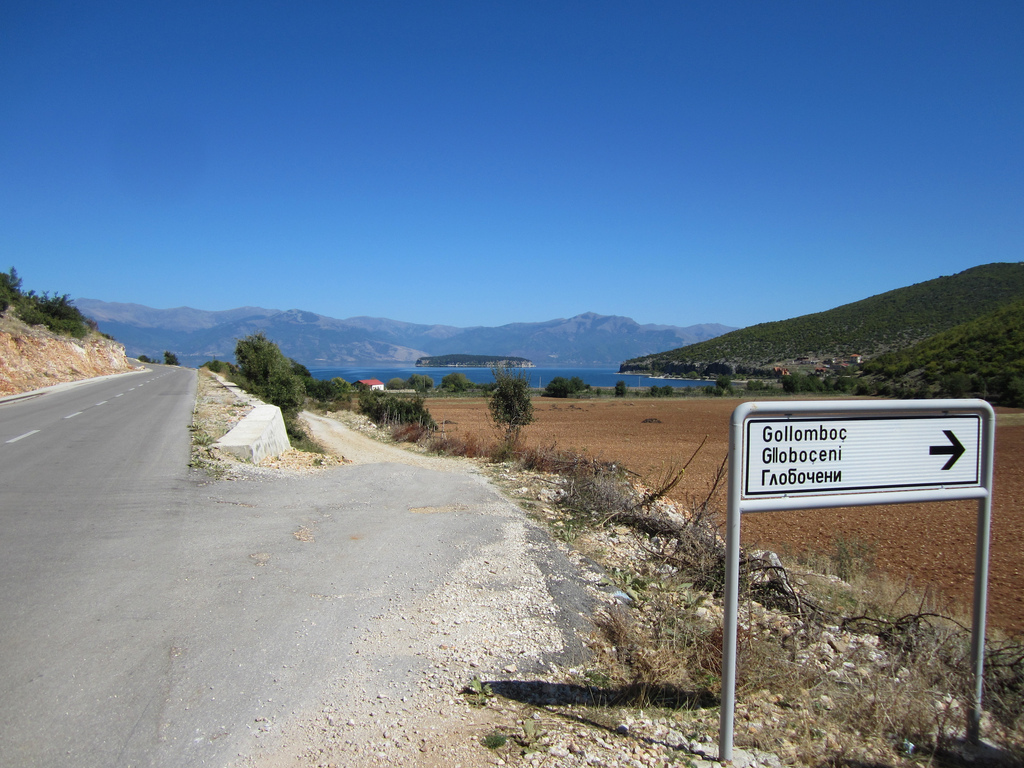
Bilingual road signs directing to Glloboçeni, written in both Albanian and Macedonian

== Demographics ==
A 2007 estimate put the village's population at 300 to 350 people. The village is composed of ethnic Macedonians, which form part of the larger Macedonian minority in Albania. According to Bulgarian sources, including a local one, the local inhabitants are Bulgarians.

Year	Population
1900	248
1926	472
1945	346
1960	217
1969	239
1979	252
1989	299
2000	294

== Culture ==
Glloboçeni is the nearest village to the Church of the Annunciation, a rock church situated on the Lake Prespa shore at an altitude of roughly 25 meters (80 feet). It was established in the 14th century.

== People from Glloboçeni ==
- Sotir Kaleškov, member of the Internal Macedonian Revolutionary Organization
- Ilinden Spasse, writer, son of Sterjo Spasse
- Sterjo Spasse, writer
- Gjorgi Tane, politician
