= Spase Mazenkovski =

Albanian writer and publicist (1953–2018)

Spase Mazenkovski (Macedonian: Спасе Мазенковски; 2 September 1953 – 30 May 2018) was an Albanian writer and publicist. He authored over 120 fables and published books, poem collections, short stories, and reports; most of these were in Macedonian, though he also published in Albanian. Mazenkovski was born in and died in the village of Leskë, having lived there his whole life. He was founder and president of the "Društvo Prespa" organization, founder and chief editor of the newspaper Prespa, and founder of the Macedonian Alliance for European Integration political party. Following his death, he was named an honorary citizen of Pustec Municipality by the municipal council. In April 2023, the newspaper Prespa marked its 30th anniversary, since its founding by Mazenkovski.
