= Bulgarians in Albania =

Ethnic group in Albania

Bulgarians in Albania Българи в Албания Bullgarët në Shqipëri
Total population
- 7,057 (2023 census)

Languages
- Bulgarian, Albanian

Religion
- Bulgarian Orthodoxy, Islam

Related ethnic groups
- Other Bulgarians, Macedonians in Albania

The Bulgarians in Albania form the largest Slavic minority of the country and fourth-largest overall. They live primarily in the areas of Mala Prespa, Gollobordë and Gora (Albania). Ethnic identity can be fluid among Albania's Slavophonic population, who might identify as Albanian, Bulgarian or Macedonian, depending on the circumstances. Between 2001 and 2016, around 4,470 Albanian nationals applied for a Bulgarian citizenship and over 2,600 of them were granted one. The Bulgarian minority was recognized by the Albanian government in October 2017. In the 2023 Albanian census, 7,057 people declared themselves to be Bulgarians.

== History ==
=== Middle Ages and Ottoman period ===
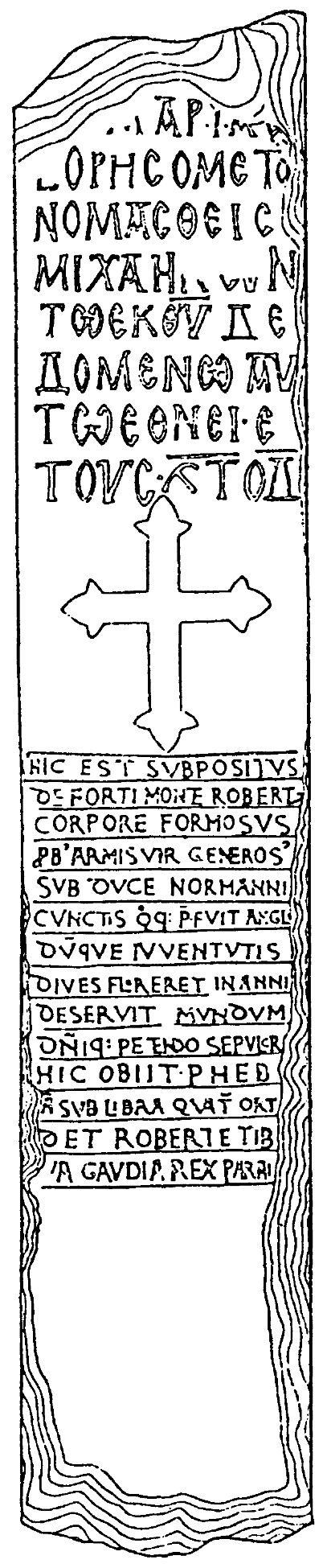
Balshi inscription.

The first reference to a Slavic presence in Albania dates to 548, when the Slavs reached Epidamnos (Durrës), capturing fortresses in the city's vicinity. Slavic settlement near Epirus in southern Albania is mentioned in a note in a 10th-century manuscript of Strabo's Geographica, and near Durrës in a Middle Bulgarian translation of the Manasses Chronicle.

Archaeologists have suggested the existence of a Bulgar archaeological culture in modern North Macedonia and eastern Albania, citing fortresses, burials, various products of metallurgy and pottery that could be of Bulgar origin.

According to toponymic evidence, Slavic settlement was concentrated in the region between the Vjosë and Devoll Rivers. Slavic placenames in this region suggest an eastern South Slavic (i.e. Bulgarian, as opposed to Serbo-Croatian) dialect. Bulgarian Slavs remained a significant group in central and southern Albania through the 15th century. In the 850s and 860s, Boris I's First Bulgarian Empire included the Slavic-inhabited areas of what is today western North Macedonia and southern Albania, which constituted the Kutmichevitsa administrative province. Kutmichevista included the cities of Ohrid, Glavinitsa (Ballsh), Belgrad (Berat) and Devoll (at the village of Zvezdë). The Bulgarian enlighteners Clement of Ohrid and Naum of Preslav are known to have worked in Kutmichevitsa, where according to the 11th-century account of Theophylact of Bulgaria, Clement had 3,500 students. Clement's and Naum's activity, as well as the consolidation of Bulgarian religious and state authority, helped establish the Bulgarian identity of this Slavic population.

From 989-995 to 1005, Albania was ruled by Samuel of Bulgaria. Under Samuel's rule, the region was governed by Ivan Vladimir, his vassal and the husband of his daughter Kosara. In 1005, the area was reconquered by the Byzantine Empire. While the area was under Byzantine rule, a Bulgarian leader named Tihomir headed an uprising against the Byzantines near Drach; he was first supported but then killed by another insurgent, Peter Delyan, who proceeded to head the uprising and briefly ruled much of Albania, North Macedonia, Serbia and western Bulgaria. In 1078, Nikephoros Vassilaki raised an army from the area surrounding Drach, consisting of "Franks (who came from Italy), Bulgarians, Romans (i.e. Byzantine Greeks) and Arvanites (i.e. Albanians)"

The area fell under Bulgarian rule again between 1231 and 1240, under Ivan Asen II, who "routed the Greek army ... and conquered the entire Greek, Albanian and Serbian land from Odrin [Edirne] to Drach." John Kukuzelis, a famous medieval composer of Bulgarian descent, was born in the city in the late 13th century.

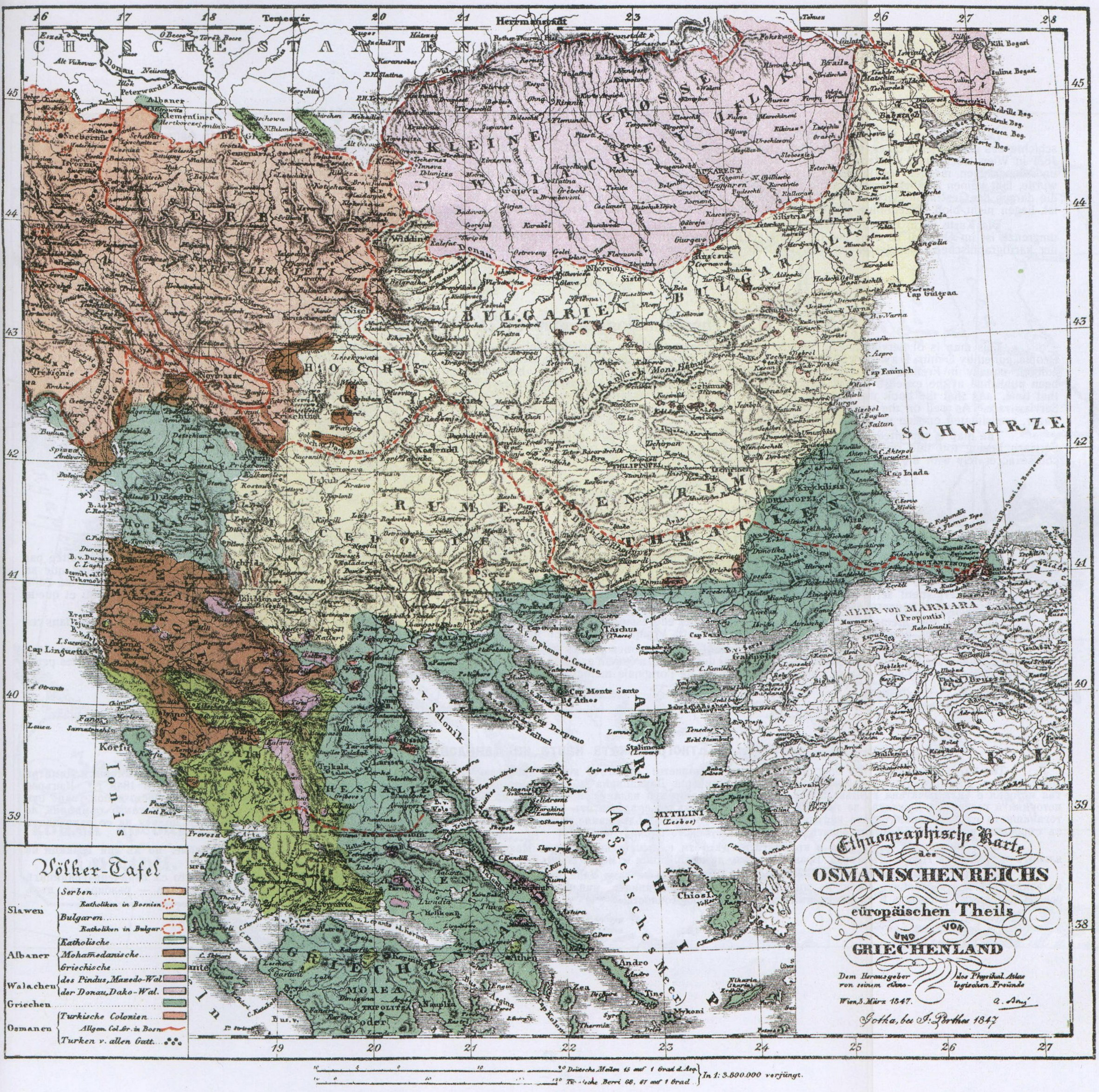
Ethnographic map of the Balkans in 1847 from Ami Boué.

Francois Pouqueville, in his 1820 book Travels in Epirus, Albania, Macedonia, and Thessaly described Bulgarian villages in the Devol region.

=== 20th century ===
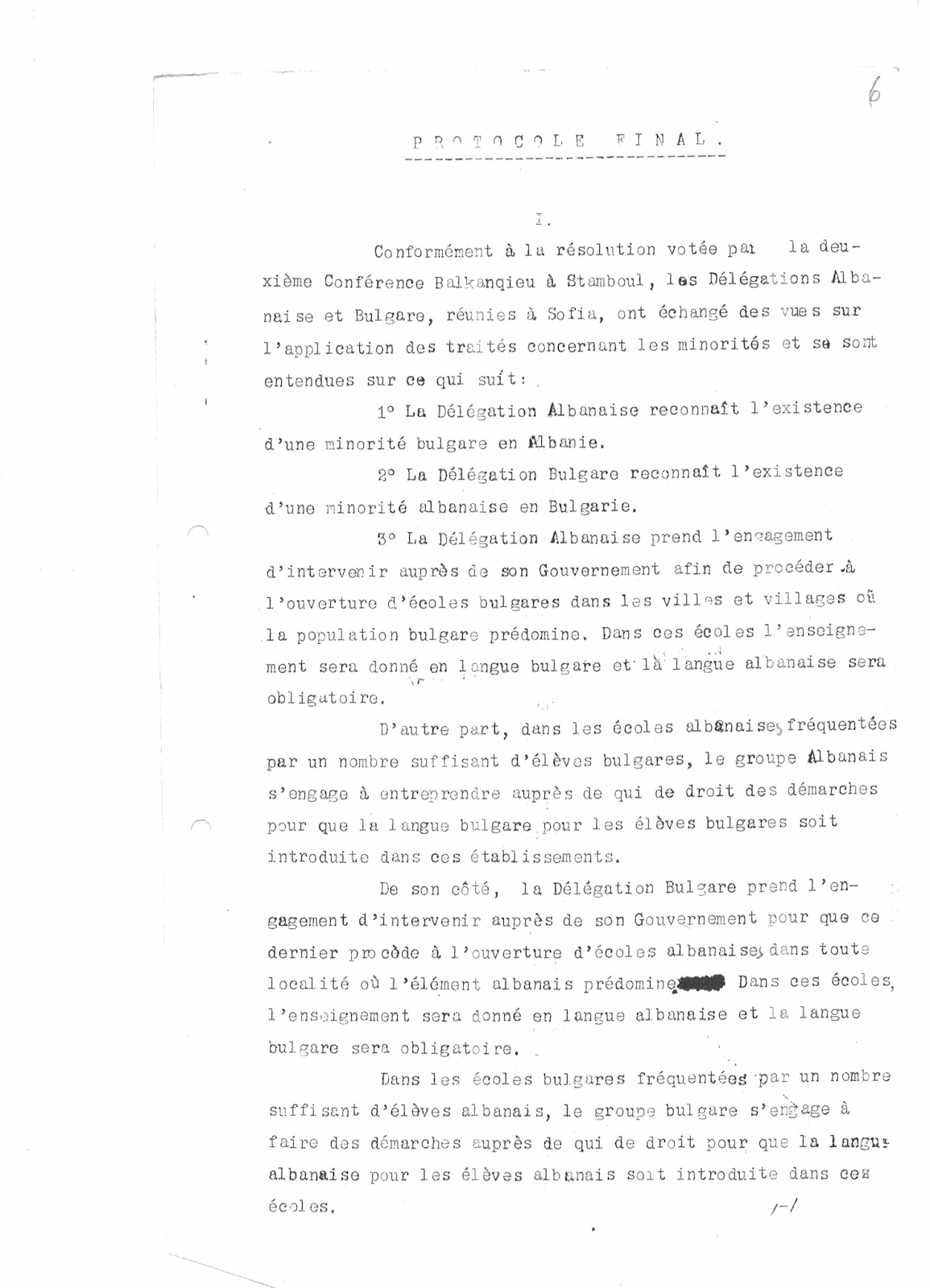
Albanian-Bulgarian Protocol from 1932 regarding the recognition of the ethnic Bulgarian minority in Albania.

According to Encyclopædia Britannica 1911 Edition, at the beginning of the 20th century, the Slavs constituted the majority of the population in Macedonia. Per Britannica itself, the bulk of the Slavs was regarded by almost all independent authorities as "Bulgarians". The partition of the Ottoman lands of the region of Macedonia between Balkan nation-states after the Balkan Wars (1912–1913) and World War I (1914–1918) left this area divided. The sub-areas of Macedonia Gollobordë and Mala Prespa were included in Albania. According to the Albanian historian Beqir Meta, the Albanians also referred then to the Slavic-speakers in Albania as Bulgarians. Per Meta, for the first time the existence of a Bulgarian minority in Albania was officially declared by Fan Noli in the League of Nations in 1921. They were estimated as 27,000 by the Macedonian National Committee in Sofia in the 1930s. In the academic year 1926/1927, the Albanian side gave permission for Bulgarian teachers to teach in the area. In 1928, some villages in the region submitted requests for opening schools with teaching in the Bulgarian language. In 1929, the position of "Chief Inspector of School Affairs in Albania" was opened at the Ministry of Foreign Affairs in Sofia, and it was entrusted to the activist from IMRO Srebren Poppetrov.

In 1932, Bulgaria and Albania signed a protocol regarding the recognition of the ethnic Bulgarian minority in Albania. However, it was not ratified by the Albanian side due to pressure from Yugoslavia. The recognition would involve Albania deeper in the conflict between Sofia and Belgrade on the Macedonian Slavs. In Albanian Macedonia, there was a pro-Bulgarian orientation among the Slavic-speaking population and the pro-Bulgarian, paramilitary Internal Macedonian Revolutionary Organization had its bases, from where it launched attacks into western Vardar Macedonia, Kingdom of Yugoslavia. Yugoslavia was suspicious of the recognition of a Bulgarian minority there and was concerned this would hinder its policy of forced Serbianisation in Serbian Macedonia. It had already blocked the ratification of similar protocol with Greece. The protocol caused a negative reaction in the Kingdom of Yugoslavia. As a result, King Zog was convinced that opposing Yugoslavia over this problem was not in his interest.

Albanian-Bulgarian relations deteriorated completely during 1933 because in March 150 Bulgarian families were deported from the villages of Gorna and Dolna Gorica. The Bulgarian chargé d'affaires in Tirana informed his government that the plan of the Albanian government was to see all Bulgarians out of the country. In August 1939, a group of former IMRO revolutionaries from Albania sent a request to the Bulgarian Quin Giovanna of Savoy, who was Italian. In their request, they call on her to stand up for the rights of the Bulgarians in Albania, which was then an Italian protectorate. The Albanian-Italian census in today's western parts of North Macedonia, then part of the Albanian Kingdom, and today most eastern parts of Albania, conducted in October 1942, a total of 234,783 people living on this territory. According to the reported results for the ethnic composition of this population, the most recorded were Albanians - 61% of the total, 31% were Bulgarians and 8% were Serbs.

On the other hand, in 1934 the Comintern gave its support to the idea that the Macedonian Slavs constituted a separate nationality. Prior to the Second World War, this view on the Macedonian issue had no practical importance. During the war, these ideas were supported by the Communist partisans in the area. After the Red Army entered the Balkans in 1944, new communist regimes came into power. In this way, their policy on the Macedonian Question was to support the development of a distinct ethnic Macedonian identity. As a result, the Slavic minority in Albania was recognized in 1945 as Macedonian.

After the fall of communism, in 1993 the then Albanian Prime Minister Aleksander Meksi openly claimed the presence of ethnic Bulgarians near the Lake Prespa. In 1998 Paskal Milo, then the Foreign Minister of Albania, made the following statement on minorities: "After World War II, we know this minority as Macedonian. I’d rather not elaborate on why we chose this way, but the Communist regime made this decision and it’s difficult for us now to change that."

=== 21st century ===
The Bulgarian government, academics, and local activists called for the recognition of the Bulgarian minority in the 2000s. Two organisations for Bulgarians in Albania exist: "Prosperitet — Golo Brdo" and the cultural association "Ivan Vazov" in Mala Prespa. More than 800 Albanian citizens of Bulgarian descent have acquired Bulgarian passports based on claims of Bulgarian origin. In 2008, the Bulgarian government reported that it had reached an agreement with the Albanian government that forms in Albania's next census would allow the Bulgarian community in the country to be counted. In 2011, Bulgaria's Finance Minister, who is responsible for relations with the Bulgarian diaspora, met with members of the Bulgarian community in Albania, announcing that a Bulgarian cultural center would be opened in Tirana. On 15 February 2017, the EU parliament in its 2016 Annual Progress Report on Albania, recommended that the rights of people of Bulgarian ethnicity in the Prespa, Gollobordë, and Gora regions should be respected.

On 12 October 2017, the Albanian parliament recognized the Bulgarian minority in Mala Prespa, Gollobordë and Gora. In the 2023 Albania census, 7,057 people declared themselves to be Bulgarians, while 2,281 declared to be ethnic Macedonians in Albania. Despite that, Macedonian organizations and activists deny the existence of local Bulgarians in Albania and present their Bulgarian self-determination as caused by a desire to obtain a Bulgarian passport.

Counties with a significant Bulgarian population (2023)
County	Bulgarians	Percentage
Kukës	2,174	3.51%
Dibër	1,736	1.61%
Tirana	1,454	0.19%
Korçë	511	0.29%
Other counties	1,182	-
Total	7,057	0.29%

== See also ==
- Albania–Bulgaria relations
- Albanians in Bulgaria
- Macedonian Question
- Albania under the Bulgarian Empire
- Ballshi inscription
- Gorani (ethnic group)
- Macedonians of Albania
- Macedonian Bulgarians

== References and notes ==
- Mangalakova, Tanya (2004). Ethnic Bulgarians in Mala Prespa and Golo Brdo (PDF). International Centre for Minority Studies and Intercultural Relations (IMIR). Archived from the original (PDF) on 5 March 2009.
- Гюзелев, Боян (2004). Албанци в Източните Балкани (Albanians in the Eastern Balkans) (in Bulgarian). София: Международен център за изследване на малцинствата и културните взаимодействия. ISBN 954-8872-45-5.
