= Edmond Temelko =

Albanian politician

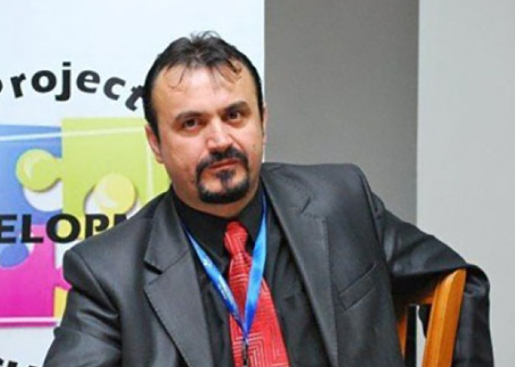

Mayor of Pustec Municipality
- In office 18 February 2007 – 30 June 2019

Personal details
- Born: 7 July 1972 (age 53) Pustec, Albania
- Citizenship: Albanian
- Occupation: Politician, agricultural technician

Edmond Temelko (Macedonian: Едмонд Темелко) is the former president of the Macedonian Alliance for European Integration. He has been mayor of the Pustec Municipality from local elections held in 2007 until 2019, before which he was councilor in the municipal council. He is an activist for Macedonian rights in Albania. Temelko is known for his political and social activity related to the position of the Macedonian minority in Albania, the preservation of the Macedonian language, identity and traditional toponyms in the Pustec region.

During his leadership of the Pustec Municipality, several local infrastructure, cultural and social initiatives were carried out. These include the restoration of the square Goce Delchev in Pustec and activities related to the church Saint Archangel Michael, as part of the preservation of the cultural and religious heritage of the local Macedonian population.

In public life, Temelko has advocated for the use and preservation of Macedonian names for villages and toponyms in the Pustec region, including Pustec, Zrnosko and other settlements. For his political and social activity, he has received several recognitions related to the affirmation of Macedonians in Albania.

== Activism ==
In 2009 he gave a speech on the Albanian Radio-Television in Macedonian to increase the national awareness of the Macedonian people. According to Temelko, Bulgaria uses heavy economic situation of Macedonians in Albania to offer them Bulgarian citizenship, passports and employment opportunity.
