= Nikola Berovski =

Macedonian educator (1923 - 1993)

Nikola Berovski (Macedonian: Никола Беровски, 1923–1993) was a Macedonian educator and translator whose entire career was spent among the Macedonians in Albania. His Macedonian-Albanian dictionary contained over 10,000 words.

== Life ==
Born in Bitola, Berovski was among the Macedonian teachers sent to Albania following World War II. His dictionary as well as his textbook in Macedonian for first grade and a grammar book for fourth-grade Macedonian were published in Tirana. After the Tito-Stalin Split in 1948, Berovski was one of two Macedonian teachers who remained in Albania, both having started families. The other teacher, Gjorgji Mileski, remained until 1957, while Berovski remained in Albania for the rest of his life.

Berovski worked with and was a friend of writer Sterjo Spasse. In commemoration of 90 years since his birth in 2013, 500 copies of his dictionary were printed by the Macedonian Ministry of Foreign Affairs and distributed among Macedonians in Albania.
