= Sterjo Spasse =

Albanian writer and novelist

- Стерјо Спасе
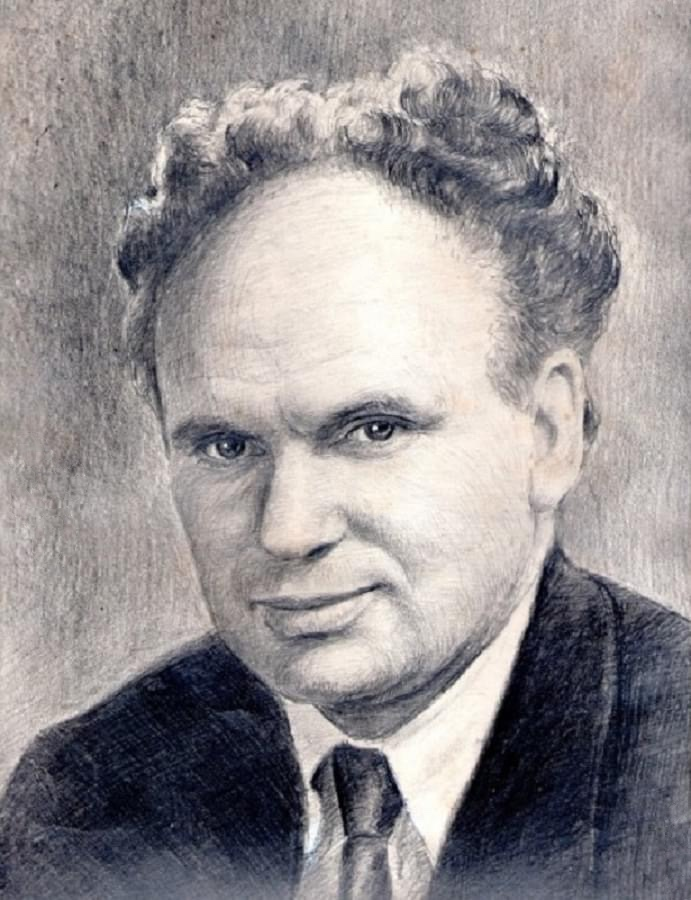
- Portrait of Sterjo Spasse
- Born: 14 August 1914; Gollomboç, Pustec, Albania
- Died: 12 September 1989 (aged 75); Tirana, Albania
- Education: University of Florence

Sterjo Spasse (Macedonian: Стерјо Спасе; 14 August 1914 – 12 September 1989) was an Albanian prose writer and novelist.

== Life ==
Sterjo Spasse was born in 1914 in Gollomboç, Pustec Municipality, Korçë District, Albania, of Macedonian Slav descent. Spasse pursued the elementary school in Korçë, and later, the Shkolla Normale e Elbasanit. He worked as a teacher in Derviçan, in the Dropull region, and then went to the University of Florence, Italy to study Pedagogy. He also pursued a master in literature in the Soviet Union.

Along his various contributions in the pedagogic field and translations, his main fieldwork was creative writing, which started in the 1930s. He published four collections of short stories and 10 novels: After World War II he worked as a literary critic and writer in the pedagogic magazines The new school (Albanian: Shkolla e re), and The popular education (Albanian: Arsimi popullor), as well as Our Literature (Albanian: Letërsia jonë), and November (Albanian: Nëntori). Spasse's novel Pse? is considered one of his better novels; it has been translated into English by Robert Wilton. He was a member of the Albanian League of Writers and Artists. Spasse died in Tirana, Albania, in 1989.

Spasse's son, Ilinden Spase (born 1934), is also a writer.

A museum dedicated to Sterjo Spasse was opened in his native village of Glloboçen in 2022.

== Short stories ==
- "Kuror rinie" (Youth crown), 1934.
- "Në krahët e një femre" (In the arms of a woman), 1934.
- "Nusja pa duvak" (Bride without veil), 1944.
- "Të fala nga fshati", (Regards from the village), 1958.

== Novels ==
- "Pse ?" (Why ?), 1935.
- "Afërdita" (Afërdita), 1944.
- "Ata nuk ishin vetëm" (They were not alone), 1952.
- "Afërdita përsëri në fshat" (Afërdita back in the village), 1954.
- "Buzë liqenit" (Lakeside), 1965.
- "Zjarre..." (Fires...), 1972.
- "Zgjimi" (Awakening), 1973.
- "Pishtarë" (Beacons), 1975.
- "Ja vdekje ja liri" (Death or freedom), 1978.
- "Kryengritësit" (Rebels), 1983.
