= Macedonian Alliance for European Integration =

Macedonian Alliance for European Integration (Macedonian Party) Aleanca Maqedonase për Integrimin Europian Македонска Алијанса за Европска Интеграција
- Leader: Vasil Sterjovski
- Founded: October 30, 2004
- Ideology: Regionalism; Conservatism; Macedonian minority interests
- Political position: Centre-right to right-wing
- European affiliation: European Free Alliance
- Council Seats: 3 / 1,613

Website
- MAEI

The Macedonian Alliance for European Integration (Macedonian Party) (Albanian: Aleanca Maqedonase për Integrimin Europian; Macedonian: Македонска Алијанса за Европска Интеграција) is a political party of the ethnic Macedonians in Albania. It was established on 30 October 2004 under the name Macedonian Alliance for European Integration and was registered as a political party on 8 June 2005. The first president of the party was Edmond Temelko, who was the mayor of the Pustec Municipality from 2007 until 2019. It first succeeded in electing an ethnic Macedonian to parliament in 2019, Vasil Sterjovski. Sterjovski himself was elected as the president of the party in September 2019. The party does not support the claims that a Bulgarian minority exists in Albania.

== History ==
The party's first congress was held on 25 April 2009 in Tirana, the capital city of Albania. At the congress the party delegates made several major decisions:

- the statute and party program were adopted
- a central committee was formed
- the party leader was elected
- the party name was changed from Macedonian Alliance for European Integration into Macedonian Party
- decisions were made about establishing regional organizations of the party

In 2011, Macedonian Alliance for European Integration informed the mediums that Macedonians in Albania will boycott the Albanian Census of 2011. Also, the party denied the results, based on the Census Law Amendments approved by the Albanian Parliament that established a fine of $1,000 to each person declaring unreal or partial data, specifically declaring ethnicity different to what is written in the birth certificate.

In August 2023, Vasil Sterjovski was unanimously re-elected as the party's president. The party became a member of the European Free Alliance in March 2024.

== Electoral results ==
=== 2007 local elections ===
The party participated in 2007 Albanian local election, obtaining 1.086 votes (0,08%) and gaining 4 councillor mandates: 1 in Trebisht and 3 in Liqenas, and Edmond Temelko with 1.468 votes supported by PS, LSI, PSD, PDS and AD was elected as mayor of the Liqenas Commune.

=== 2009 parliamentary elections ===
The party participated in the 2009 Albanian parliamentary election and entered a coalition with the Democratic Party of Albania of prime minister Sali Berisha.

=== 2011 local elections ===
In the 2011 local elections of Albania, the Macedonian Party president Edmond Temelko was re-elected as the mayor of the Liqenas Commune. The party received a plurality in two municipalities, Liqenas (28.5%) and Trebisht (19.6%). The party also received a significant percentage of votes in Bilisht, Pirg, and other regions bordering the Republic of Macedonia.

=== 2015 local elections ===
The party participated in 2015 Albanian local election, obtaining 3,647 votes (0.23%) and gaining 9 councilor mandates: 7 in Pustec, 1 in Pogradec and 1 in Maliq, and Edmond Temelko with 2,076 votes supported by ASE was elected as mayor of the Pustec Municipality.

=== 2023 local elections ===
In the 2023 Albanian local elections, the Macedonian Alliance for European Integration was in coalition with the ruling Socialist Party and supported the incumbent Socialist Party mayor of Pustec, Pali Kolefski. The party had candidates for councilors in Pustec, though Macedonian candidates in other parts of the country ran under the Socialist Party. Kolefski faced and defeated Pandi Jani, supported by the opposition. MAEI member Jovan Shkëmbi was elected to Pogradec local council and was subsequently selected for the council of Korçë County along with MAEI party member from Pustec Takjo Grozdani.
