= Kimet Fetahu =

Albanian academic and activist

Kimet Fetahu (Macedonian: Кимет Фетаху) is an Albanian academic and minority rights activist.

== Life ==
Fetahu was born in 1955 in Trebisht in the Gollobordë region of Albania and completed studies in Albania and China. He has served as director of the non-governmental organization Center for Ethnic Studies. He has also been a university professor in Tirana. Fetahu is president of the ethnic Macedonian association "Mir" (meaning peace), which he founded in 1991 under its first name "Bratstvo" (meaning brotherhood).

Fetahu has made exaggerated estimates about the size of minority groups in Albania forming 35% of the total population. He has also stated that Macedonians in Albania number between 100,000 and 130,000.

In 2022, the Macedonian Alliance for European Integration officially proposed Fetahu for President of Albania.
