= Prespa e Vogël and Golloborda =

Prespa e Vogël and Golloborda are regions in Albania. See the articles on the individual regions:

- Mala Prespa
- Golloborda
