= Villages of Korçë County =

The Korçë County in southeastern Albania is subdivided into 6 municipalities. These municipalities contain 342 towns and villages:
