= Shulin, Albania =

Shulin Шулин Diellas
- Village
- Location within Albania
- Coordinates: 40°48′8″N 20°54′38″E
- Country: Albania
- County: Korçë
- Municipality: Pustec
- Administrative unit: Pustec

Population (2000)
  - Total: 502
- Time zone: UTC+1 (CET)
  - Summer (DST): UTC+2 (CEST)

Shulin (Albanian: Shulin; Macedonian/Bulgarian: Шулин), formerly known officially as Diellas, is a village southeast of Lake Prespa in the Pustec Municipality which is officially recognised as a Macedonian minority zone located in the Korçë County, Albania. The village is composed of ethnic Macedonians, which form part of the larger Macedonian minority in Albania.

== History ==
In 1939, on behalf of 37 Bulgarian houses in Shulin Goge Lambrov signed a request by the local Bulgarians to the Bulgarian tsaritsa Giovanna requesting her intervention for the protection of the Bulgarian people in Albania - at that time an Italian protectorate.

In 2013, the village's official name was changed back from "Diellas" to "Shulin", the Macedonian name.

== Demographics ==
In 1900, Vasil Kanchov gathered and compiled statistics on demographics in the area and reported that the village of Chegan was inhabited by about 270 Macedonian Christians.

According to a survey by Georgi Trajčev in 1911 and 1912, Shulin had 23 houses and 375 Macedonian residents.

A 2007 estimate put the village population in the range of 600 to 650 people.

According to sources, including research by a scientist from Albania, the local inhabitants are Macedonians.

== Dialect ==
Although Shulin is located in modern-day Korçë County, the village traditionally belongs to the Lower Prespa region, and therefore its inhabitants speak the Lower Prespa dialect rather than the neighbouring Korča dialect of Macedonian.

Recounting youth and marriage
Excerpt from a story told by an older woman from Shulin in the native Lower Prespa dialect

== People from Shulin ==
- Takjo Grozdani, Macedonian Party member
