= Cerje, Albania =

Cerje Церје
- Village
- Location within Albania
- Coordinates: 40°44′58″N 20°58′32″E
- Country: Albania
- County: Korçë
- Municipality: Pustec
- Administrative unit: Pustec

Population (2000)
  - Total: 252
- Time zone: UTC+1 (CET)
  - Summer (DST): UTC+2 (CEST)

Cerje (Albanian definite form: Cerja, Macedonian: Церје) is a village at the southeastern end of Pustec Municipality which is officially recognised as a Macedonian minority zone located in the Korçë County of Albania, near the border with Greece. The village is composed of ethnic Macedonians, which form part of the larger Macedonian minority in Albania.

== History ==
In 1900, Vasil Kanchov gathered and compiled statistics on demographics in the area and reported that the village of Cerja (Церя) was inhabited by about 120 Bulgarian Christians. In 1904, following the Ilinden Uprising, Cerje came under the Bulgarian Exarchate.

In 1911, the village was recorded by Georgi Trajčev as a Bulgarian village having six houses and 54 inhabitants.

In 1939, on behalf of 15 Bulgarian houses in Cerje Fote Fotev signed a request by the local Bulgarians to the Bulgarian tsaritsa Giovanna requesting her intervention for the protection of the Bulgarian people in Albania - at that time an Italian protectorate.

== Demographics ==
According to a 2007 source, Cerje is the least populous village in Pustec Municipality, having only a small amount of elderly residents.

Year	Population
1900	120
1926	98
1945	175
1960	250
1969	308
1979	308
1989	297
2000	252
