= Nikolaos Politis =

Greek diplomat (1872–1942)

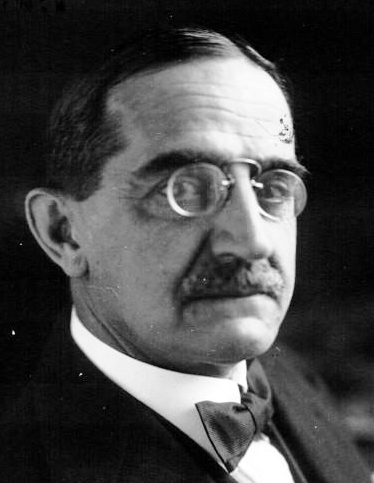
Nikolaos Politis in 1927

Nikolaos Politis or Nikolaos Polites (also spelled Nicolas Politis; Greek: Νικόλαος Πολίτης; 1872 in Corfu, Greece – 1942 in Cannes, France) was a Greek diplomat in the early 20th century. He was a professor of law by training, and prior to the First World War, he taught law at the University of Paris and at the University of Aix.

A supporter of Eleftherios Venizelos, he served alongside Venizelos as a delegate to the London Conference of 1912–1913 and as his Minister of Foreign Affairs from 1916 to 1920 and again in 1922. He also served as Greece's representative to the League of Nations, during which time he signed the Politis–Kalfov Protocol between Greece and Bulgaria and promoted a resolution at the League Disarmament Commission that enabled it to continue its work.

He served as a member of the International Olympic Committee from 1930 to 1933. In 1933, he participated with Soviet Commissar of Foreign Affairs Maxim Litvinov in formulating the Convention on the Definition of Aggression.

In 1935, he served as Minister Plenipotentiary in Paris and in that capacity supported the restoration of the Greek monarchy.

He died in Cannes in 1942.

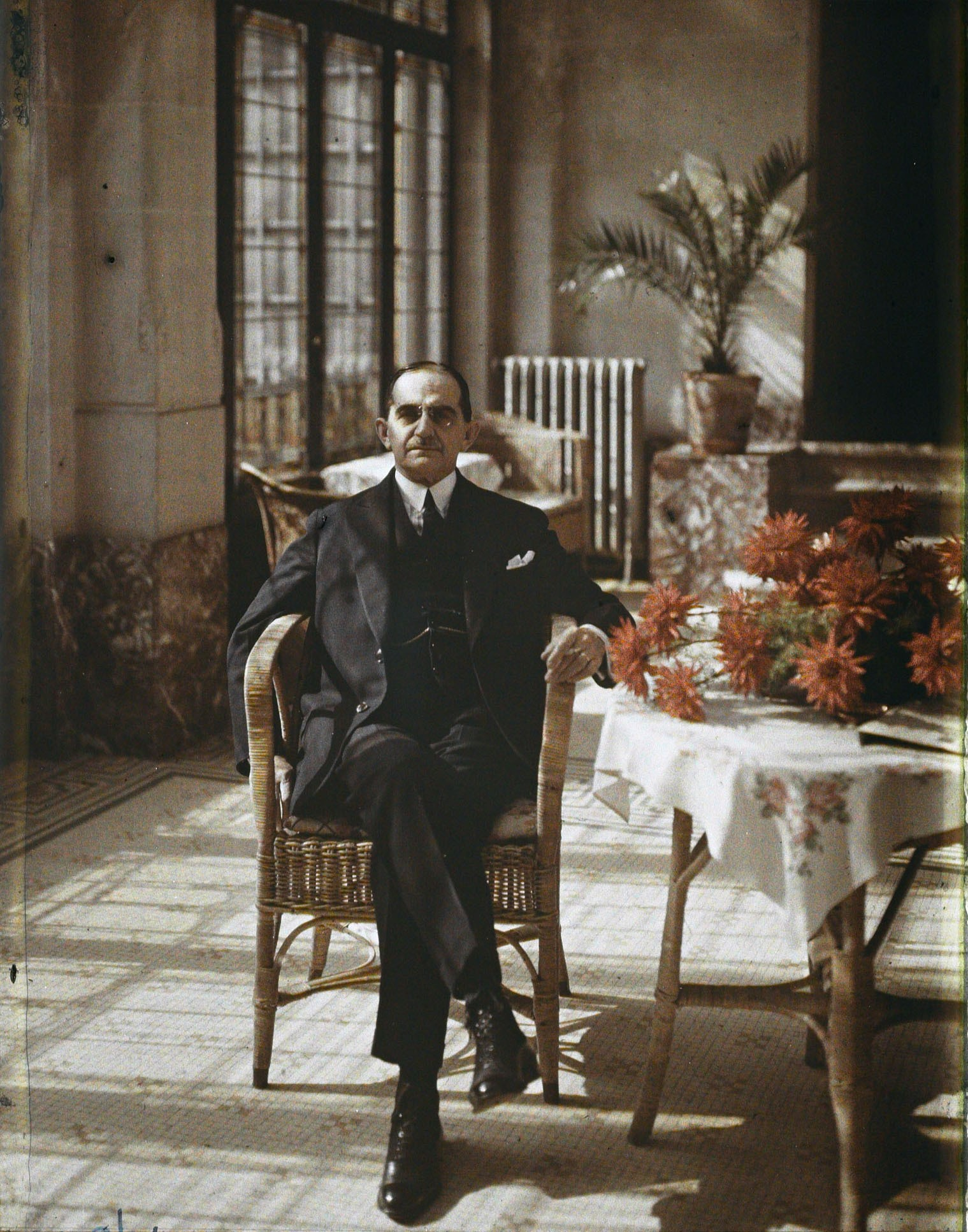
Politis in The Hague, 1929 autochrome by Stéphane Passet

== Works (partial list) ==
- Les Emprunts d'Etat en Droit International (1894)
- "Le Problème des Limitations de la Souveraineté et de la Théorie de l’Abus des Droits dans les Rapports Internationaux", 6 RdC (1925)
