= Albanian-Bulgarian Protocol (1932) =

1932 treaty between Albania and Bulgaria

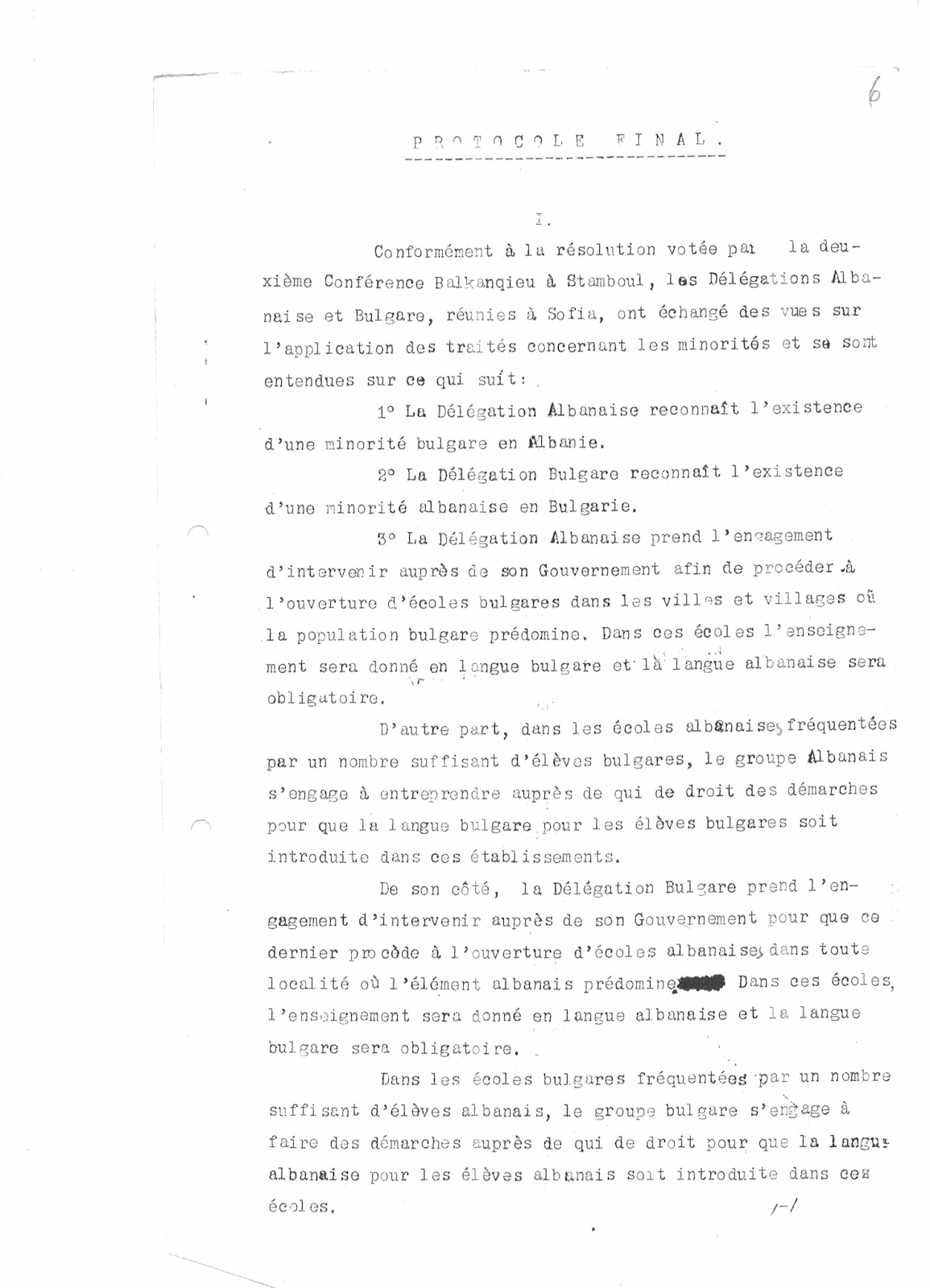
Albanian-Bulgarian Protocol

The Albanian-Bulgarian Protocol was a bilateral document signed in Sofia on 9 January 1932 between the Albanian Kingdom and the Kingdom of Bulgaria concerning mutual protection for each other's minority populations. However the protocol was never ratified by Albania, and tensions over the minority issue had returned by 1933.

== History ==
After the establishment of diplomatic relations between both countries in 1922, the major problem in their relations was that the Albanian authorities did not recognise the status of the Bulgarian minority in Albania. That recognition would involve Albania deeper in the conflict between Sofia and Belgrade on the Macedonian Slavs. In Albanian Macedonia, the Bulgarophile sentiments of the Slavic-speaking locals caused the pro-Bulgarian paramilitary Internal Macedonian Revolutionary Organization to have its bases there from which it launched attacks into the Kingdom of Yugoslavia.

Yugoslavia was suspicious of the recognition of a Bulgarian minority there and was concerned that would hinder its policy of forced Serbianisation in Serbian Macedonia. It had already blocked the ratification of similar protocol with Greece. However, in 1930 during the First Balkan Conference in Athens and especially on the Second Balkan Conference in Istanbul in 1931, the two delegations raised the problem of the Bulgarian minority but were opposed by the Yugoslavia.

Nevertheless, on 9 January 1932, the protocol on the reciprocal protection of minorities in Albania and Bulgaria was signed in Sofia by Andrey Toshev and Yanko Sakazov from Bulgarian side and by Mehmed Konica from the Albanian side. Both countries agreed to open schools for the teaching of the languages of the minorities and agreed to sign the so-called Balkan Pact.

The protocol caused a negative reaction in the Kingdom of Yugoslavia. As a result, King Zog was convinced that opposing Yugoslavia over that problem was not in his interest. For that reason, Albania did not support the Bulgariae's demands for ratification of the protocol. Albanian-Bulgarian relations deteriorated completely during 1933 because in March 150 Bulgarian families were deported from the villages of Gorna and Dolna Gorica. The Bulgarian chargé d'affaires in Tirana informed his government that the plan of the Albanian government was to see all Bulgarians out of the country.
