= Pustec =

Pustec: Пустец (Macedonian); Liqenas
- Village
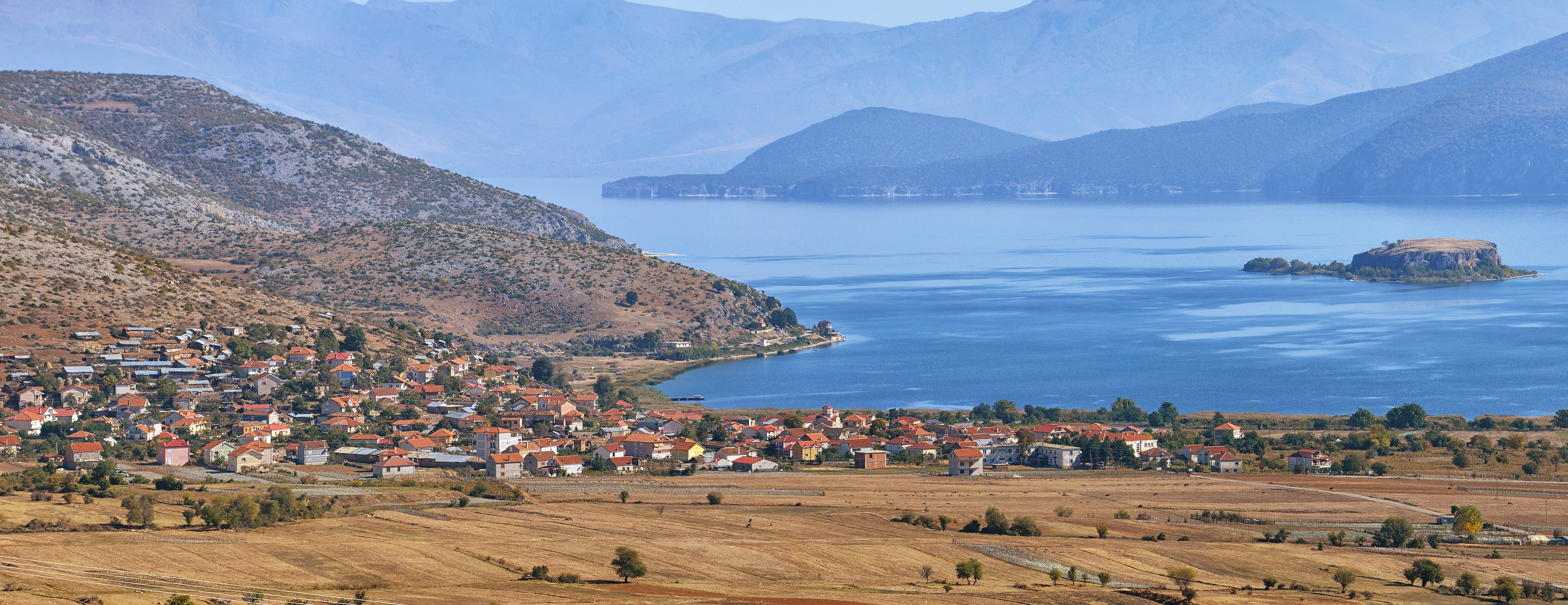
- Pustec and the island of Maligrad

- Emblem

- Location within Albania
- Coordinates: 40°47′13″N 20°54′08″E
- Country: Albania
- County: Korçë
- Municipality: Pustec
- Administrative unit: Pustec
- Elevation: 861 m (2,825 ft)

Population (2000)
  - Total: 1,120
- Time zone: UTC+1 (CET)
  - Summer (DST): UTC+2 (CEST)

Pustec (Albanian: Pustec; Macedonian: Пустец) formerly known as Liqenas (1973–2013), is a village in Pustec Municipality, Korçë County, eastern Albania. Situated on the southwestern shore of Lake Prespa, it is home to much of the Macedonian minority in Albania.

== Geography ==
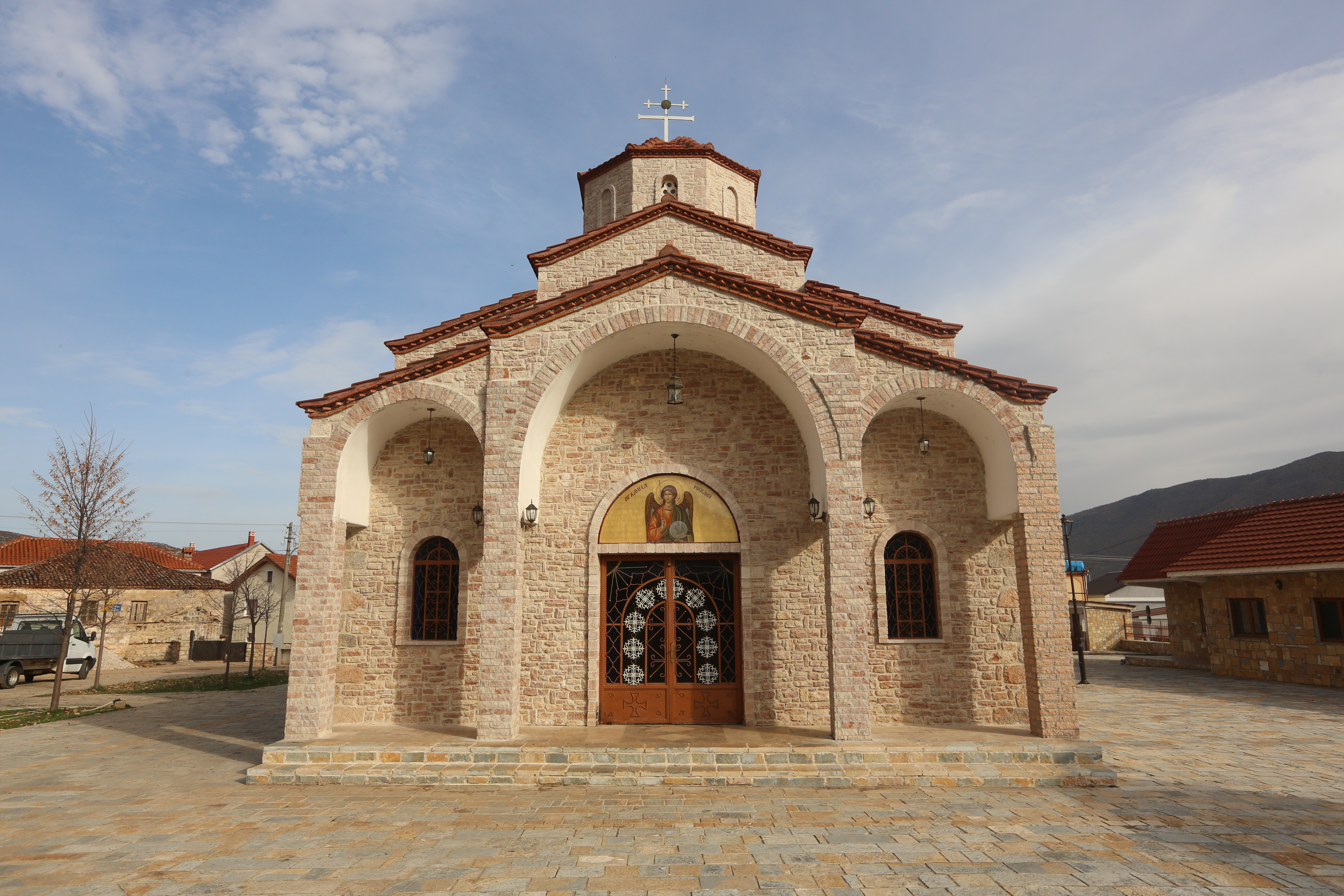
Church in Pustec

Pustec is located on the southwestern shore of Lake Prespa and is the nearest village to the island of Maligrad. It sits at an elevation of 861 metres (2,825 ft) above sea level. To the northeast, along the lake, lies Shulin, while in the southeast is the village of Leska.

Pustec and the surrounding region lie within the Prespa National Park.

== History ==
The village of Pustec was mentioned in the Slepche Beadroll from the 16th century.

The La Macédoine et sa Population Chrétienne survey by Dimitar Mishev (D. Brancoff) from 1905 shows that the inhabitants of the village of Pustec (Bulgarian: Пустец) were in the bosom of the Bulgarian Exarchate. There were 400 Bulgarian Exarchists in the village.

The French linguist André Mazon in his study on Slavic folklore in Albania from 1936 noted Pustec as a Bulgarian village in the region of Mala Prespa.

In 1939, on behalf of 70 Bulgarian houses in Pustec, Todor Postalov signed a request by the local Bulgarians to the Bulgarian tsaritsa Giovanna requesting her intervention for the protection of the Bulgarian people in Albania – at that time an Italian protectorate.

In 1973, the official name of the village was changed to Liqenas by the Albanian government. In 2013, however, the original Slavic name, Pustec, was once again made official by the Albanian government.

== Demographics ==
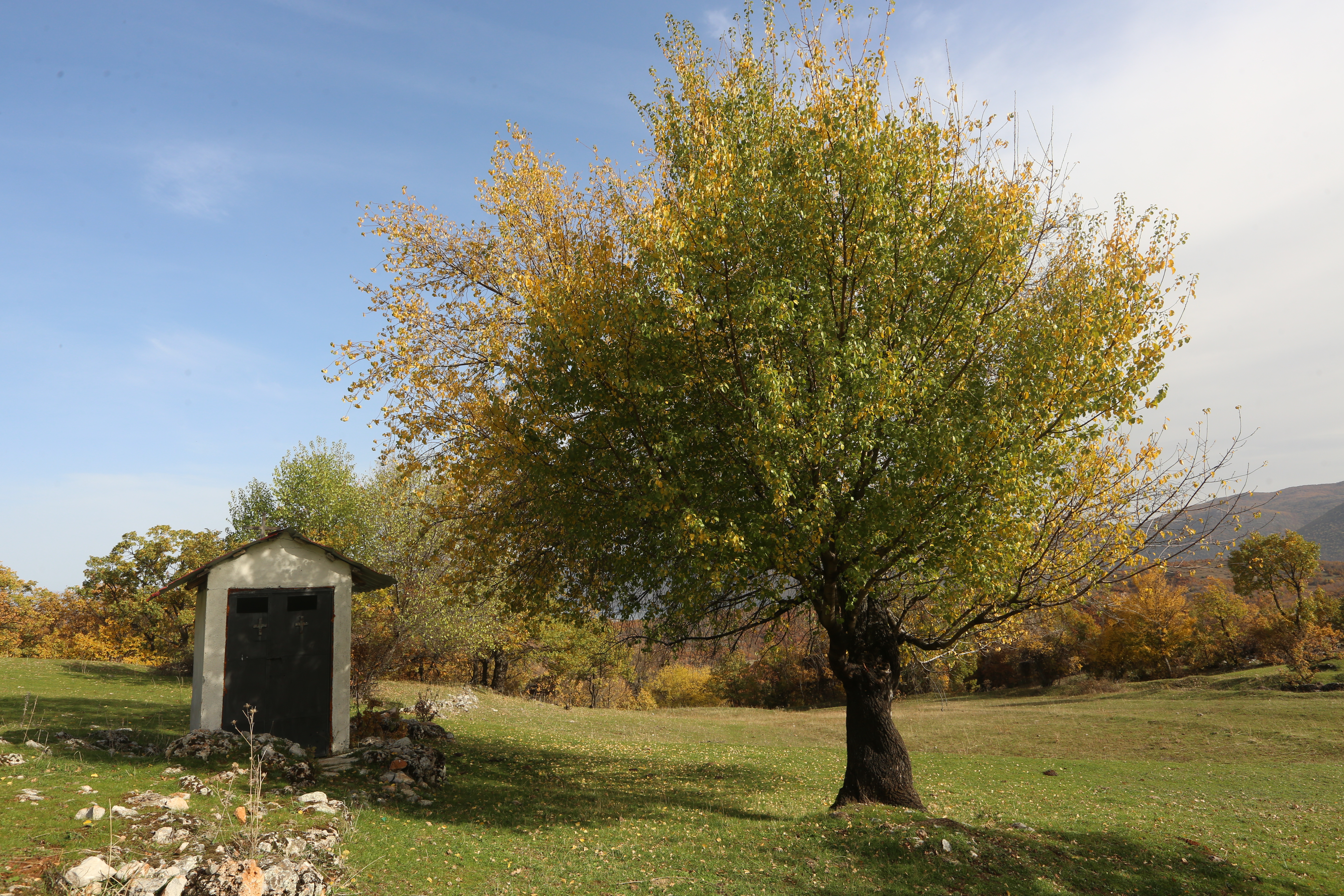
Chapel in Pustec

The majority of the population are ethnic Macedonians.

Year	Population
1900	410
1926	515
1945	565
1960	697
1969	788
1979	941
1989	1035
2000	1120

== Culture ==
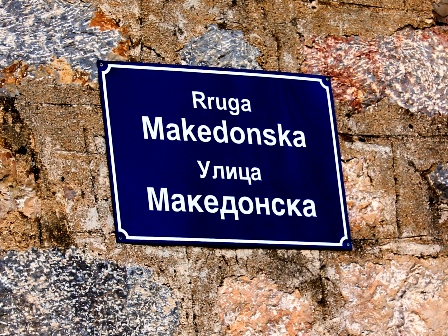
Bilingual road sign in Pustec written in both Albanian (top) and Macedonian (bottom)

The village of Pustec is situated near two centuries'-old rock churches. The first, Saint Michael the Archangel, is situated on the Lake Prespa shore. Its oldest frescoes date from the 12th century. The other, St Nicholas, contains only fragments of its original frescoes. Pustec is home to an ethnographic museum, established by Spase Trpo in 2023.

== People from Pustec ==
- Trajan Gjorgjiovski, partisan
- Mitre Kolevski, partisan
- Edmond Temelko, mayor of Pustec Municipality and president of the Macedonian Party
