= Gorna Goricë =

Gorna Goricë Gorna Gorica Goricë e Madhe Горна Горица
- Village
- Location within Albania
- Coordinates: 40°53′39″N 20°54′10″E
- Country: Albania
- County: Korçë
- Municipality: Pustec
- Administrative unit: Pustec

Population (2000)
  - Total: 515
- Time zone: UTC+1 (CET)
  - Summer (DST): UTC+2 (CEST)

Gorna Goricë (Albanian: Gorna Gorica; Macedonian/Bulgarian: Горна Горица), previously officially known as Goricë e Madhe, is a village in the Pustec Municipality which is officially recognised as a Macedonian minority zone located in the Korçë County in Albania. It is situated west of Lake Prespa and the village of Tuminec, and northwest of the village of Dolna Gorica. The village is composed of ethnic Macedonians, which form part of the larger Macedonian minority in Albania.

== History ==
Gorna Gorica is a proposed location of the ancient fortified settlement of Pelion.

In the late 19th century, the village came under the Bulgarian Exarchate. The village had 33 houses and 404 Bulgarian Orthodox Christian residents at that time. The "La Macédoine et sa Population Chrétienne" survey by Bulgarian Exarchate secretary Dimitar Mishev (D. Brankov) concluded that village had 360 Bulgarian Exarchists residents in 1905. In March 1933, Albania deported 150 Bulgarian families from the village, after the Albanian side refused to ratify the Albanian-Bulgarian protocol of 1932.

In 2013, the village's official name was changed from "Goricë e Madhe" to "Gorna Gorica".

== Demographics ==
Year	Population
1900	285
1926	511 (with Dolna Gorica)
1945	201
1960	329
1969	369
1979	406
1989	489
2000	515

According to sources, including research by a scientist from Albania, the local inhabitants have Macedonian roots.

== Culture ==
The Church of Saint Demetrius in Gorna Goricë dates from the second half of the 19th century. Restoration work began on the church in 2023.
