= Pirg =

- Administrative unit
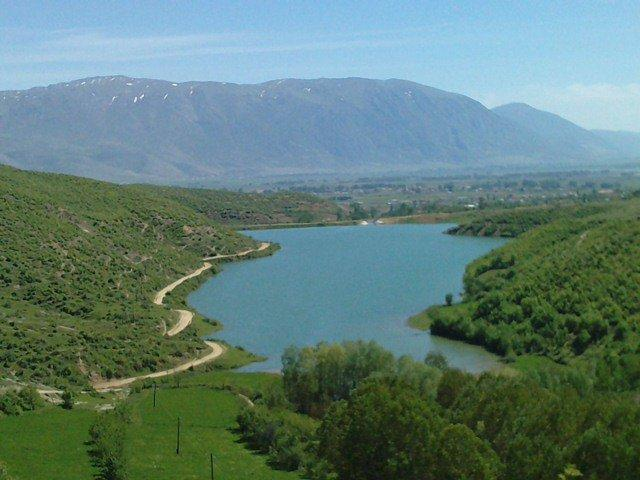
- Leminot reservoir lake in Pirg

- Location within Albania
- Coordinates: 40°47′N 20°42′E
- Country: Albania
- County: Korçë
- Municipality: Maliq

Population (2011)
  - Administrative unit: 7,652
- Time zone: UTC+1 (CET)
  - Summer (DST): UTC+2 (CEST)
- Postal Code: 7016
- Area Code: (0)865

Pirg is a village and a former municipality in the Korçë County, southeastern Albania. At the 2015 local government reform it became a subdivision of the municipality Maliq. The population at the 2011 census was 7,652. The municipal unit consists of the villages Pirg, Gurishtë, Zvirinë, Leminot, Qershizë, Kakaç, Shqitas, Veliternë, Sovjan, Novoselë and Bubuq. The etymology of this village comes from greek, meaning “Tower” in English. This means this village must’ve had an important tower, to be named as it.
