= Politis–Kalfov Protocol =

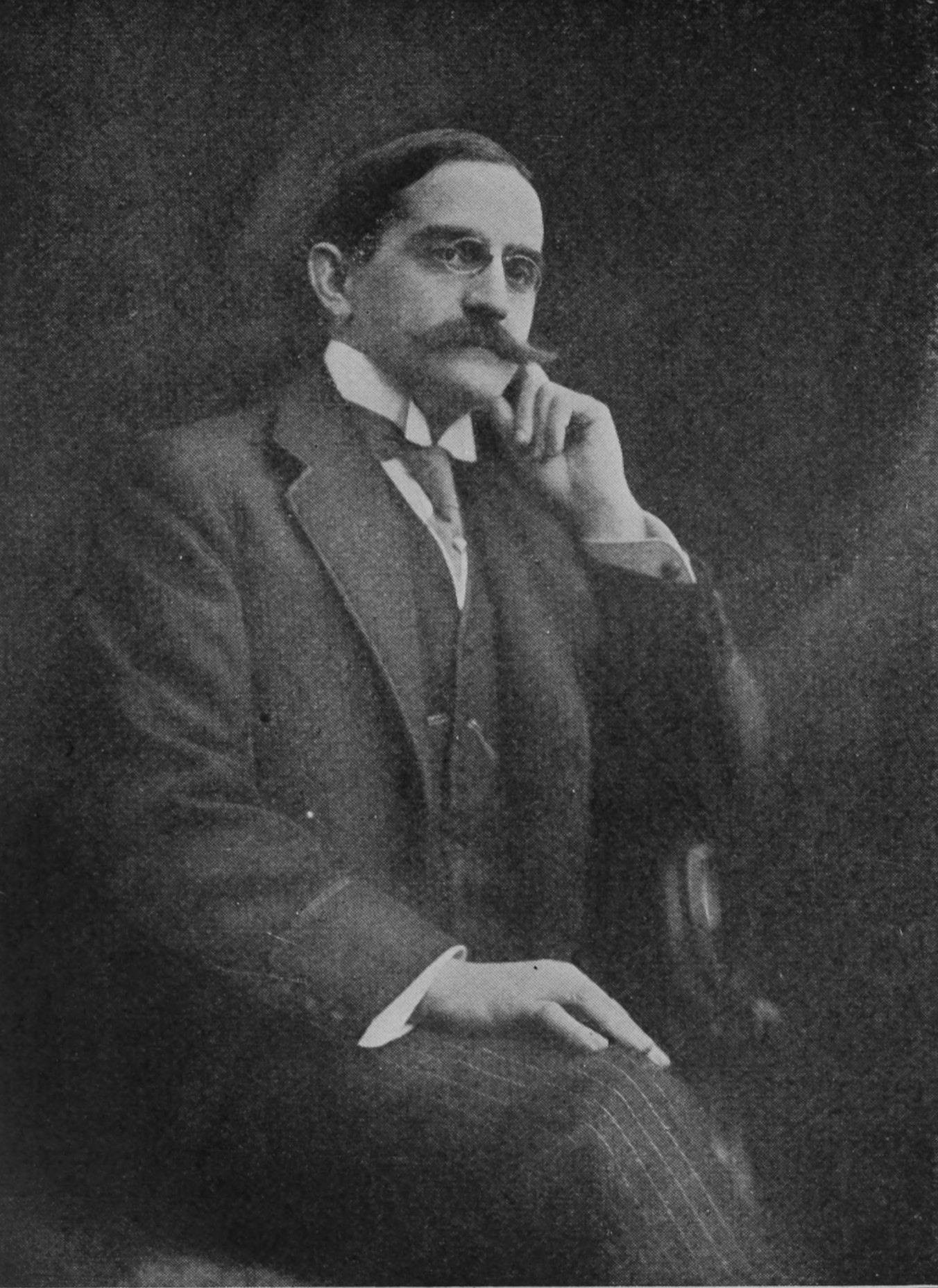
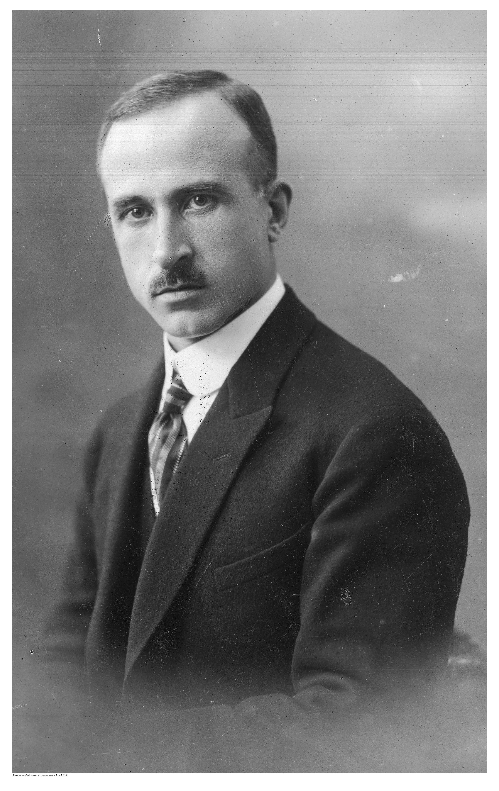
Nikolaos Politis (left) and Hristo Kalfov (right)

The Politis–Kalfov Protocol (Bulgarian: Спогодба Калфов – Политис; Greek: Πρωτόκολλο Πολίτη – Καλφώφ) was a bilateral agreement signed in 1924 at the League of Nations in Geneva between Greece and Bulgaria. It addressed the "protection of the Bulgarian minority in Greece". However, it was never ratified by the Greek parliament.

== History ==
After the Tarlis incident in which 17 Bulgarian peasants were killed by a Greek soldier on July 27, 1924, near the Greco-Bulgarian border, tensions between the two countries increased.

To secure crucial foreign loans for refugee rehabilitation after the Greco-Turkish War, Greece attempted to improve its international image by recognizing its Slavic-speaking citizens as a national minority. As a result, on 29 September 1924 a protocol was signed at the League of Nations in Geneva by Nikolaos Politis and Hristo Kalfov, concerning the "Protection of the Bulgarian minority in Greece". This agreement constituted the first official acknowledgement by Greece that a Bulgarian minority existed there. The Bulgarian National Assembly quickly ratified it in October. The protocol obliged Greece to treat all members of this minority according to the terms of the Treaty of Sèvres. The Greeks agreed to sponsor Bulgarian-minority schools, to allow the presence of Exarchist priests if they obtained Greek citizenship and to open a minority affairs bureau in Thessaloniki and to administer minority rights.

Meanwhile, in Greece, internal reaction against the Protocol arose because public opinion stood against the recognition of any Bulgarian minority in Northern Greece. Belgrade also was suspicious of Greece's recognition of a Bulgarian minority and was annoyed that would hinder its policy of forced Serbianisation in Vardar Macedonia. On February 2, 1925, the Greek Parliament, claiming pressure from the Kingdom of Yugoslavia, which threatened to renounce the Greek–Serbian Alliance of 1913, refused to ratify the agreement. On 29 May 1925, the Greek government maintained that Greece was open to any suggestions concerning the "Slavic-speaking linguistic minority" but that the existence of an ethno-religious (Bulgarian Exarchist minority) was completely unacceptable.

== See also ==
- Albanian-Bulgarian Protocol (1932)
- Incident at Petrich
- Slavic speakers of Greek Macedonia
