= Leskë =

Leskë Leska Lajthizë Леска
- Village
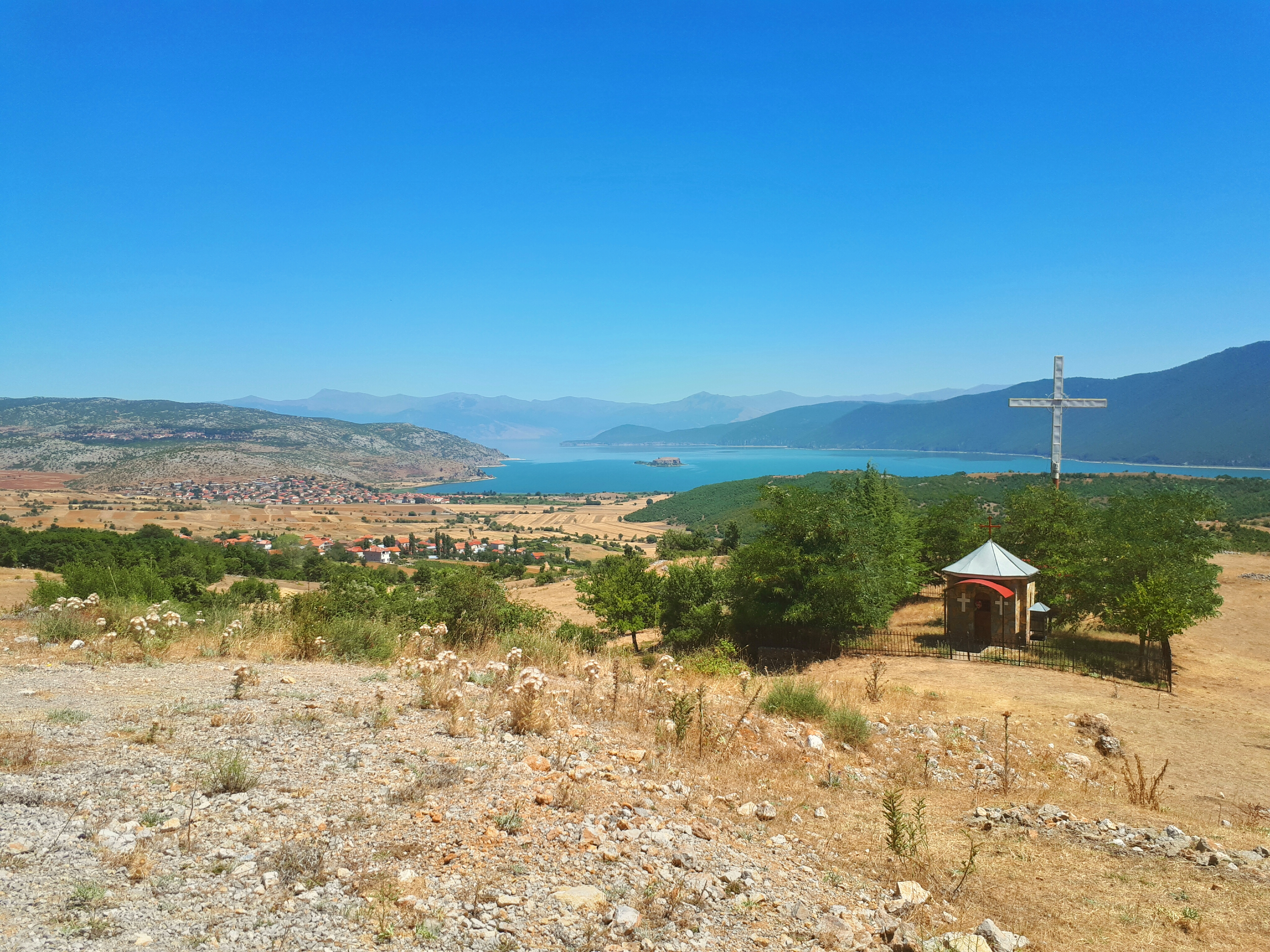
- Panoramic views of the villages Leska and Pustec (forefront is Leska)

- Location within Albania
- Coordinates: 40°46′40″N 20°53′20″E
- Country: Albania
- County: Korçë
- Municipality: Pustec
- Administrative unit: Pustec

Population (2007)
  - Total: 350
- Time zone: UTC+1 (CET)
  - Summer (DST): UTC+2 (CEST)

Leskë (Albanian definite form: Leska, formerly Lajthizë "place of hazelnuts"; Macedonian/Bulgarian: Леска) is a village in the Pustec Municipality of the Korçë County in Albania. Leska is situated west of Lake Prespa, near the village of Pustec. The village is mainly composed of ethnic Macedonians.

== Name ==
In early 20th century scholarly works of Selishchev, Jaranov and Vasmer, the village placename is given as Leska, while Kanchov gives the form Ljaitiza which stems from the Albanian word Lajthi meaning hazelnut. The toponym Leska is topographic referring to Hazel trees.

In 2013, the village's official name was changed back from "Lajthizë" to "Leska".

== History ==
In 1939, on behalf of 15 Bulgarian houses in Leska, Lazo Traykov signed a request by the local Bulgarians to the Bulgarian tsaritsa Giovanna requesting her intervention for the protection of the Bulgarian people in Albania - at that time an Italian protectorate.

== Demographics ==
The "La Macédoine et sa Population Chrétienne" survey by Dimitar Mishev (D. Brankov) concluded that village had 120 Bulgarian Exarchists residents in 1905.

A 2007 estimate put the village population around 300 to 350 residents.

== People from Leska ==
- Sotir Risto (mk) (1974 - ), poet
