= Dollna Goricë =

Dollna Goricë Dolna Gorica Goricë e Vogël Долна Горица
- Village
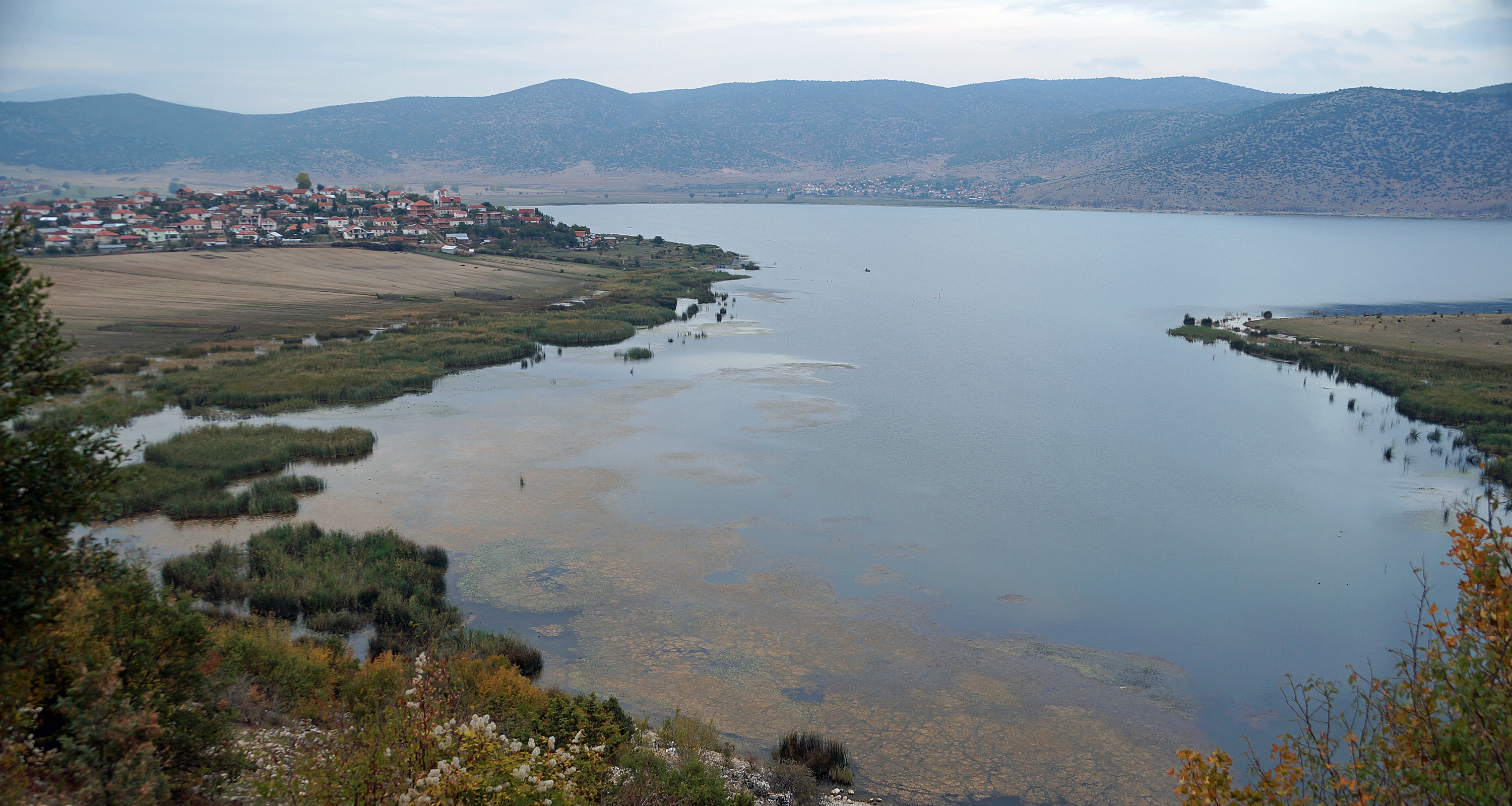
- Dolna Gorica and Lake Prespa

- Location within Albania
- Coordinates: 40°52′37.92″N 20°55′30″E
- Country: Albania
- County: Korçë
- Municipality: Pustec
- Administrative unit: Pustec

Population (2007)
  - Total: 550
- Time zone: UTC+1 (CET)
  - Summer (DST): UTC+2 (CEST)

Dollna Goricë (Albanian: Dollna Gorica, Macedonian : Долна Горица), formerly Goricë e Vogël, is a village on the western shore of Lake Prespa in the Pustec Municipality which is officially recognised as a Macedonian minority zone located in the Korçë County in Albania.

== History ==
A survey in the late 19th century found Dolna Gorica to consist of 75 houses and 67 male Bulgarian Exarchist residents. In 1900, Vasil Kanchov gathered and compiled statistics on demographics in the area and reported that the village of Dolna Goritsa was inhabited by about 42 Bulgarian Christians.

In February 1996, the village hosted a conference attended by officials from the Republic of Macedonia on the subject of the ethnic Macedonian minority in Albania. In 2013, the village's official name was changed from "Goricë e Vogël" to "Dolna Gorica".

== Demographics ==
A 2007 estimate put the village's population at 550. According to Bulgarian sources, including research by a Bulgarian scientist from Albania, the local inhabitants are Bulgarians.

Demographics
Year	Population
1900	42
1926	511 (with Gorna Gorica)
1945	149
1960	108
1969	210
1979	271
1989	253
2000	364

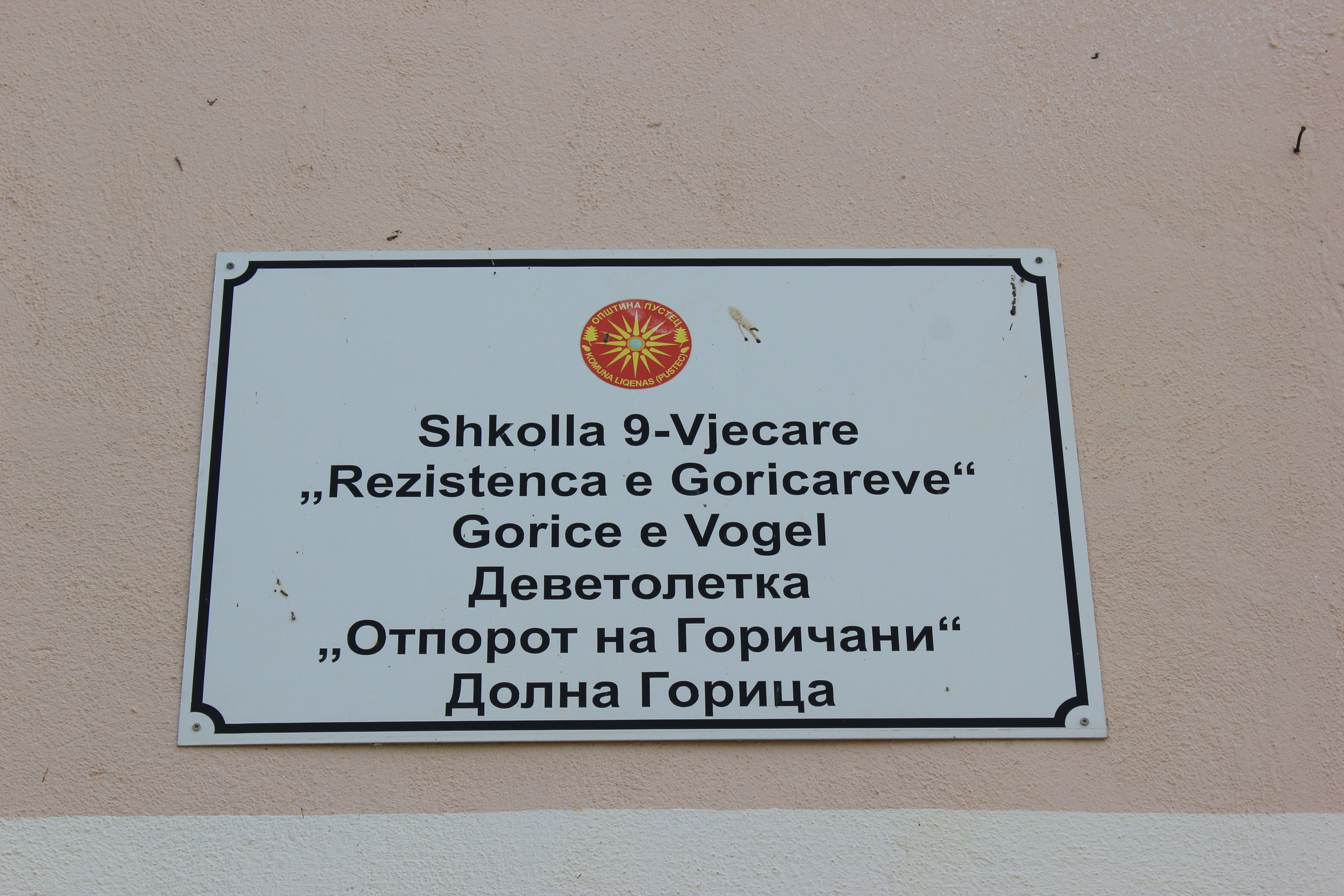
Bilingual sign in Dolna Gorica, written in both Macedonian and Albanian

== Culture ==
In 2002, a library opened in the village consisting of primarily Macedonian-language books.

A monument commemorating the ethnic Macedonian refugees of the Greek Civil War was unveiled in the village in May, 2013.

Dolna Gorica is home to the annual "Day of Wine" event, occurring each December.
