= Mala Prespa =

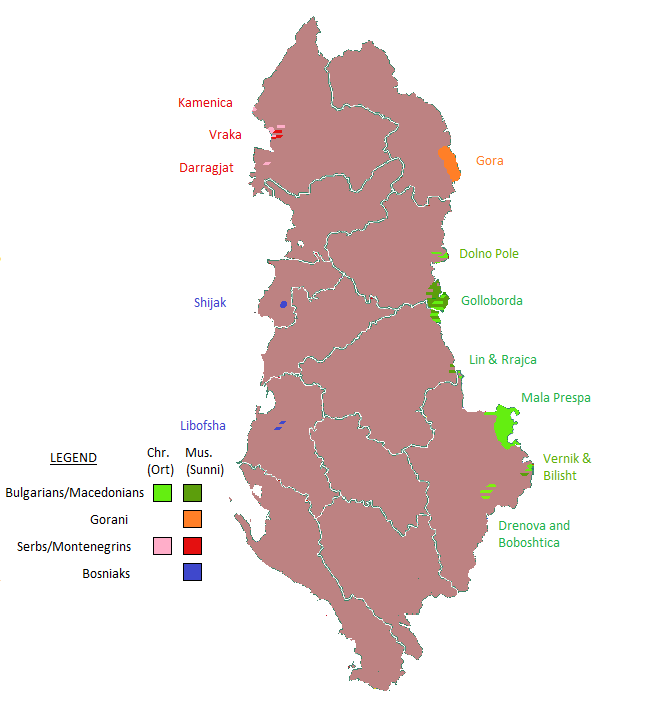
Historical location of Slavic groups that inhabited Albania in the early 20th century.

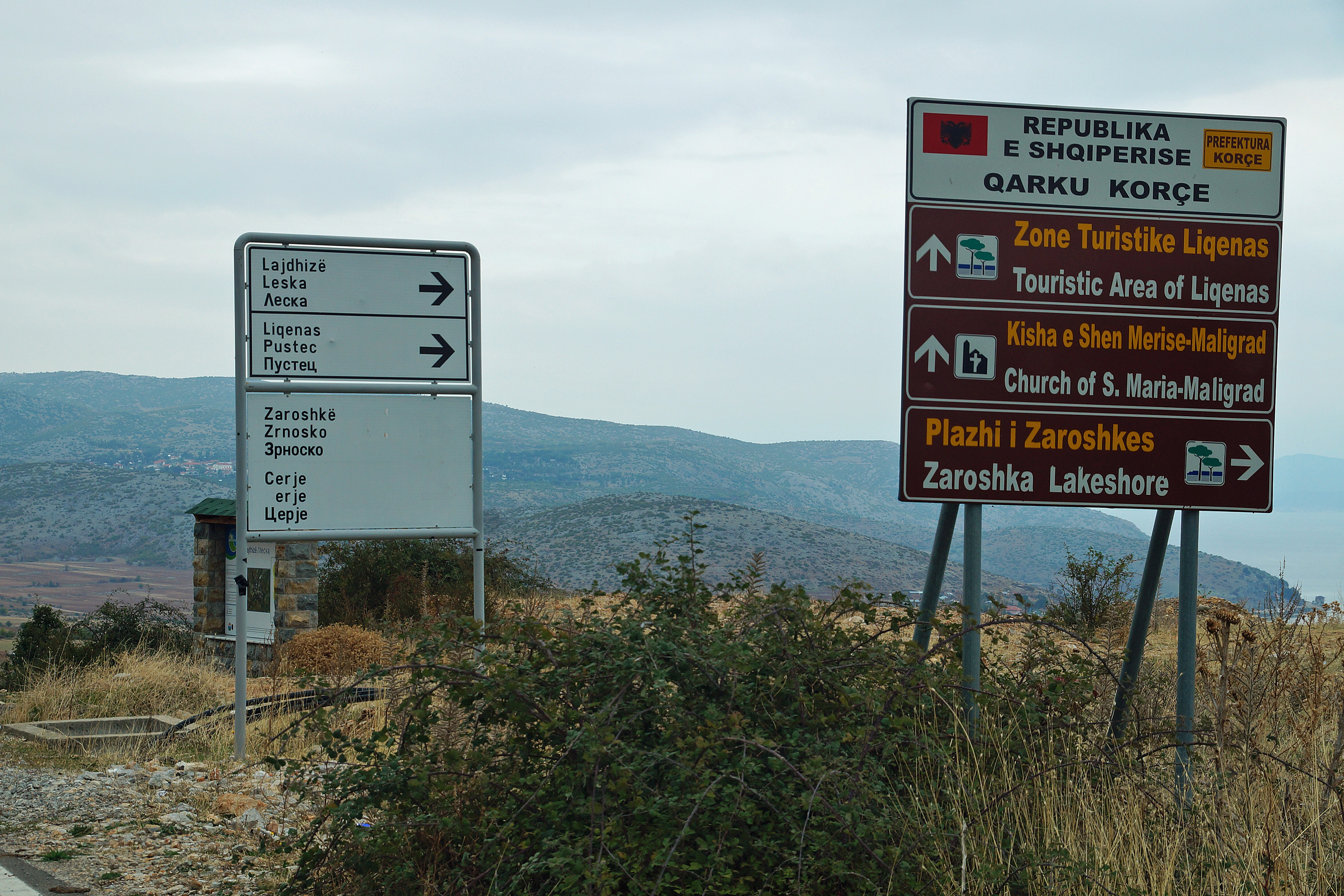
A bilingual directional road sign in Pustec Municipality, written in both Albanian and Macedonian

Mala Prespa or Prespa e Vogël (Macedonian and Bulgarian: Мала Преспа, lit. 'Small Prespa') is a term used to denote a geographical area in eastern Albania, part of the wider region of Prespa. It is located on the western shore of Lake Prespa along the southeastern edge of Albania within the wider Korçë County and bordering the Pogradec and Devoll municipalities. The area is synonymous with Pustec Municipality.

It is officially recognised as a Macedonian minority zone. According to the 2011 Census, in Albania there are about 5,000 Macedonians, primarily in the Mala Prespa area, forming 97% of the population of the Pustec Municipality. This area also contains small numbers of Aromanians (Arvanito-Vlachs) and, according to Bulgarian sources, Bulgarians.

== See also ==
- Gollobordë

== Sources ==
- "Osservatorio balcani e caucaso transeuropa;— Albania and minorities". www.balcanicaucaso.org.
