= Pustec (municipality) =

Pustec Пустец Liqenas
- Municipality
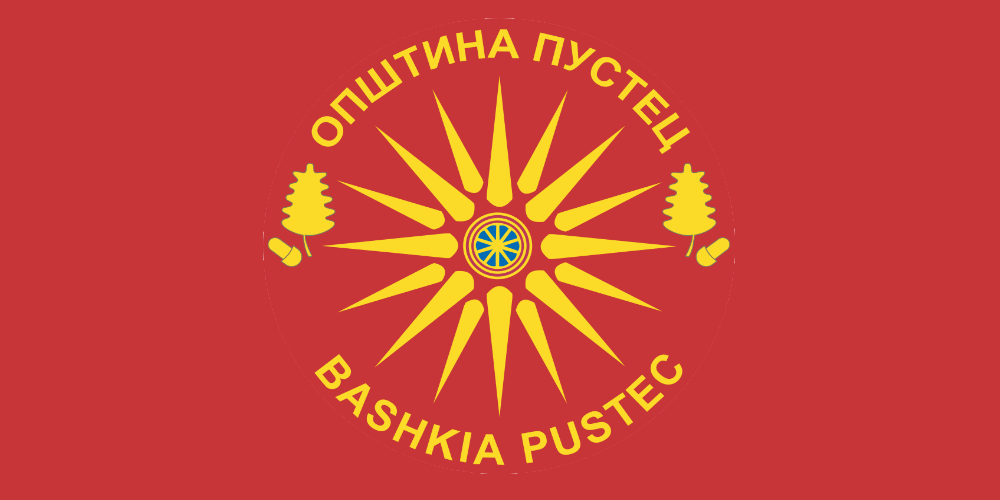
- Flag Emblem

- Location within Albania
- Coordinates: 40°47′13″N 20°54′08″E
- Country: Albania
- County: Korçë

Government
  - Mayor: Pali Kolefski (PS)

Area
  - Municipality: 243.60 km^{2} (94.05 sq mi)

Population (2011)
  - Municipality: 3,290
  - Municipality density: 13.5/km^{2} (35.0/sq mi)
- Time zone: UTC+1 (CET)
  - Summer (DST): UTC+2 (CEST)
- Postal Code: 7020
- Area Code: (0)867
- Website: www.bashkiapustec.gov.al

Pustec Municipality (Albanian: Bashkia Pustec; Macedonian: Општина Пустец), previously known as Liqenas Commune (Albanian: Komuna Liqenas) from 1973 to 2013, is a municipality in the Korçë County of Albania. The population at the 2011 census was 3,290, in a total area of 243.6 km^{2} (94.1 sq mi). The municipality's flag features the Vergina Sun.

It consists of nine villages, comprising the areas along the Albanian, the southwestern shore of Lake Prespa. It is part of the so-called Mala Prespa area, which is home to a large part of the local ethnic Macedonian minority of Albania. Albanian and Macedonian are official languages of the municipality.

== History ==
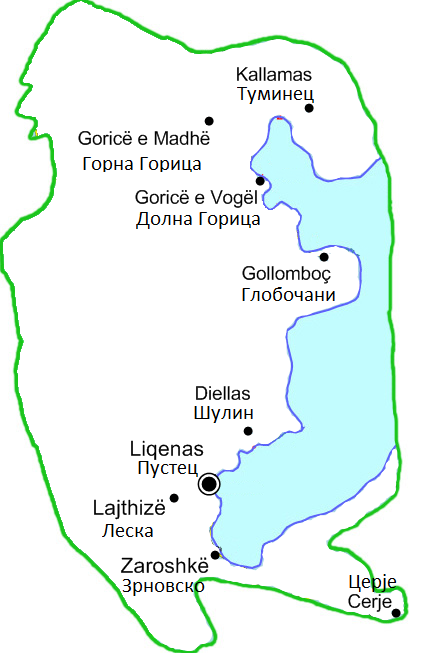
The villages within Pustec Municipality

The village of Cerje was first mentioned in documents from the 14th century. The names of other villages were found in more modern documents. According to a 1900 ethnographic survey, the number of inhabitants at the time was 1,830. The "La Macédoine et sa Population Chrétienne" survey by Dimitar Mishev (D. Brankov) from 1905 shows that the local Christian inhabitants were divided between Bulgarian Exarchate and Patriarchate of Constantinople. On 18 March 2013, the Albanian government changed the official name of the municipality, from the Albanian Liqenas to the Macedonian Pustec.

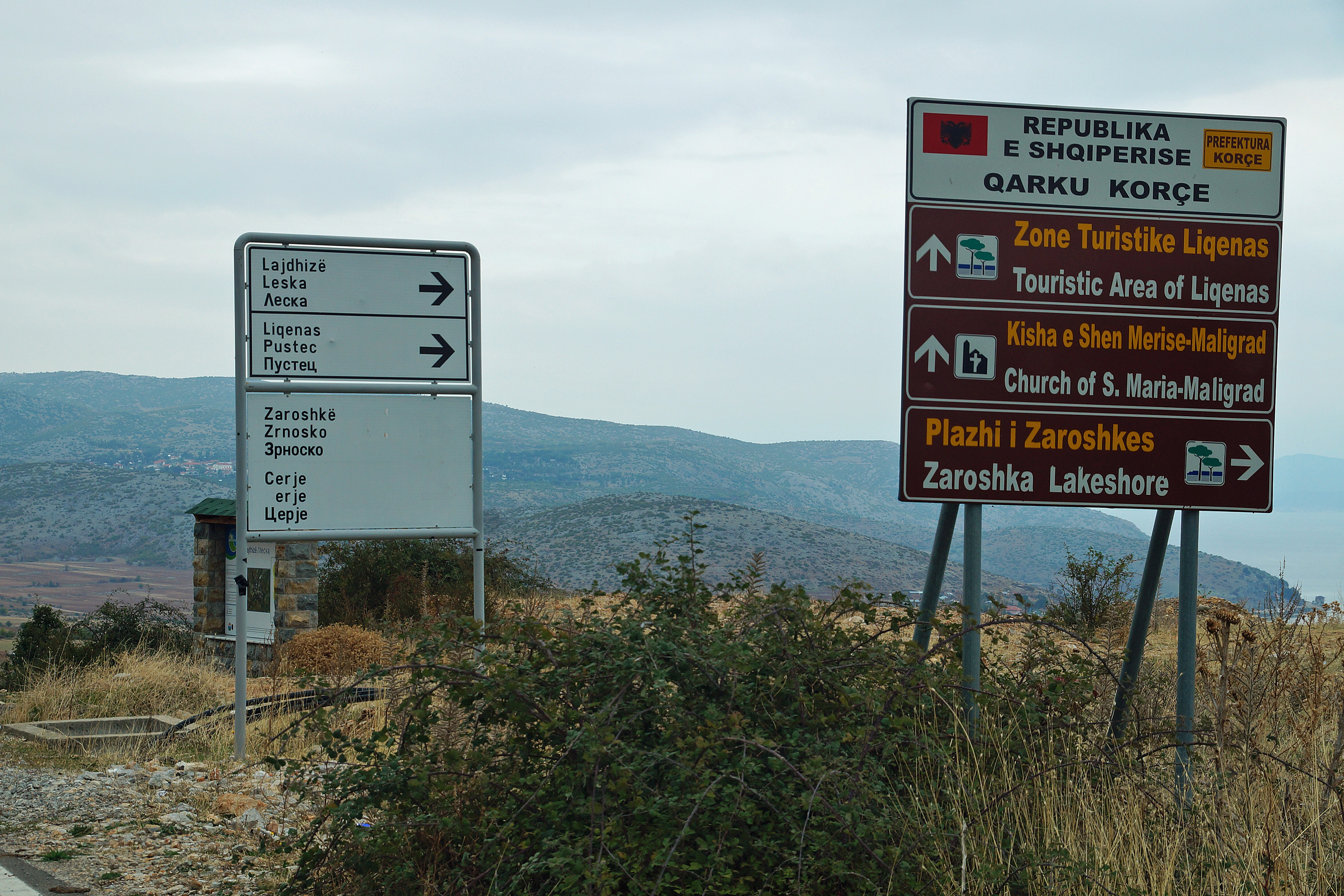
A road sign in Mala Prespa indicating the direction of Pustec, written in both Albanian and Macedonian

== Villages ==
The municipality contains nine villages.

- Cerje
- Dollna Goricë
- Glloboçen
- Gorna Goricë
- Leskë
- Pustec
- Shulin
- Tuminec
- Zërnovskë

== Demographics ==
According to the 2011 census, 97% of the municipality's residents were ethnic Macedonians and 96% were Orthodox Christians.

As per 2022, according to INSTAT, Pustec had only 8 births, second lowest only to Dropull.

== Education ==
Each of the nine villages in the municipality has an elementary school. Gorna Gorice has an 8-year school, while Pustec has both an 8-year school and a secondary school.

== Twinned municipalities ==
- Novaci Municipality, North Macedonia
