= Korçë County =

County in southeastern Albania

Korçë County Qarku i Korçës (Albanian)
- County
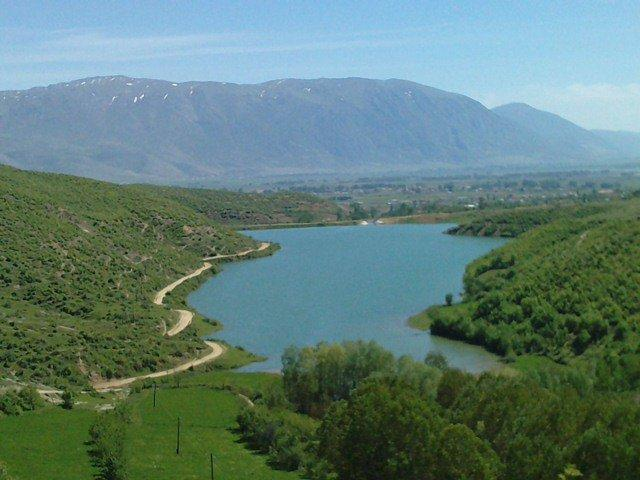
- Leminot Reservoir

- Flag Emblem

- Map of Albania with Korçë County highlighted
- Coordinates: 40°40′N 20°48′E
- Country: Albania
- Seat: Korçë
- Subdivisions: 6 municipalities: Devoll; Kolonjë; Korçë; Maliq; Pogradec; Pustec

Government
  - Council chairman: Erjon Nexhipi (PS)

Area
  - Total: 3,711 km^{2} (1,433 sq mi)
  - Rank: 1st

Population (2023)
  - Total: 173,091
  - Rank: 5th
  - Density: 46.64/km^{2} (120.8/sq mi)
- Time zone: UTC+1 (CET)
  - Summer (DST): UTC+2 (CEST)
- HDI (2023): 0.828 very high · 5th
- NUTS Code: AL034

Korçë County (Albanian: Qarku Korçë), officially the County of Korçë (Albanian: Qarku i Korçës), is a county in the Southern Region of the Republic of Albania. It is the largest by area and the fifth most populous of the twelve counties, with more than 173,000 people within an area of 3,711 km^{2} (1,433 sq mi). The county borders on North Macedonia to the northeast and Greece to the southeast, the counties of Elbasan to the northwest, Berat to the west and Gjirokastër to the southwest. It is divided into six municipalities, Korçë, Devoll, Kolonjë, Maliq, Pogradec and Pustec, with all of whom incorporate thirty-seven administrative units.

== Geography ==
=== Protected areas ===
The Ministry of Tourism and Environment manages numerous natural sites and protected areas in Korçë County. In conjunction with numerous national natural sites and areas, the National Agency of Protected Areas has the Fir of Drenovë National Park and Prespa National Park under its administration. The UNESCO Ohrid-Prespa Transboundary Biosphere Reserve is also encompassed in the county.

== Demographics ==
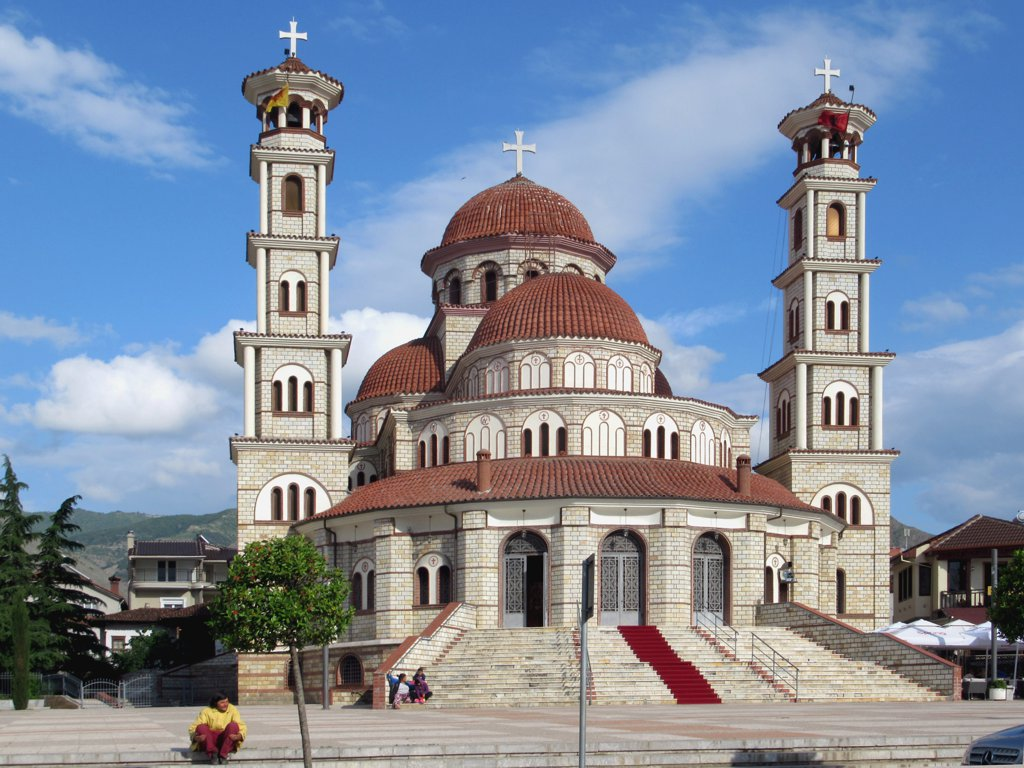
The Resurrection Cathedral in Korçë

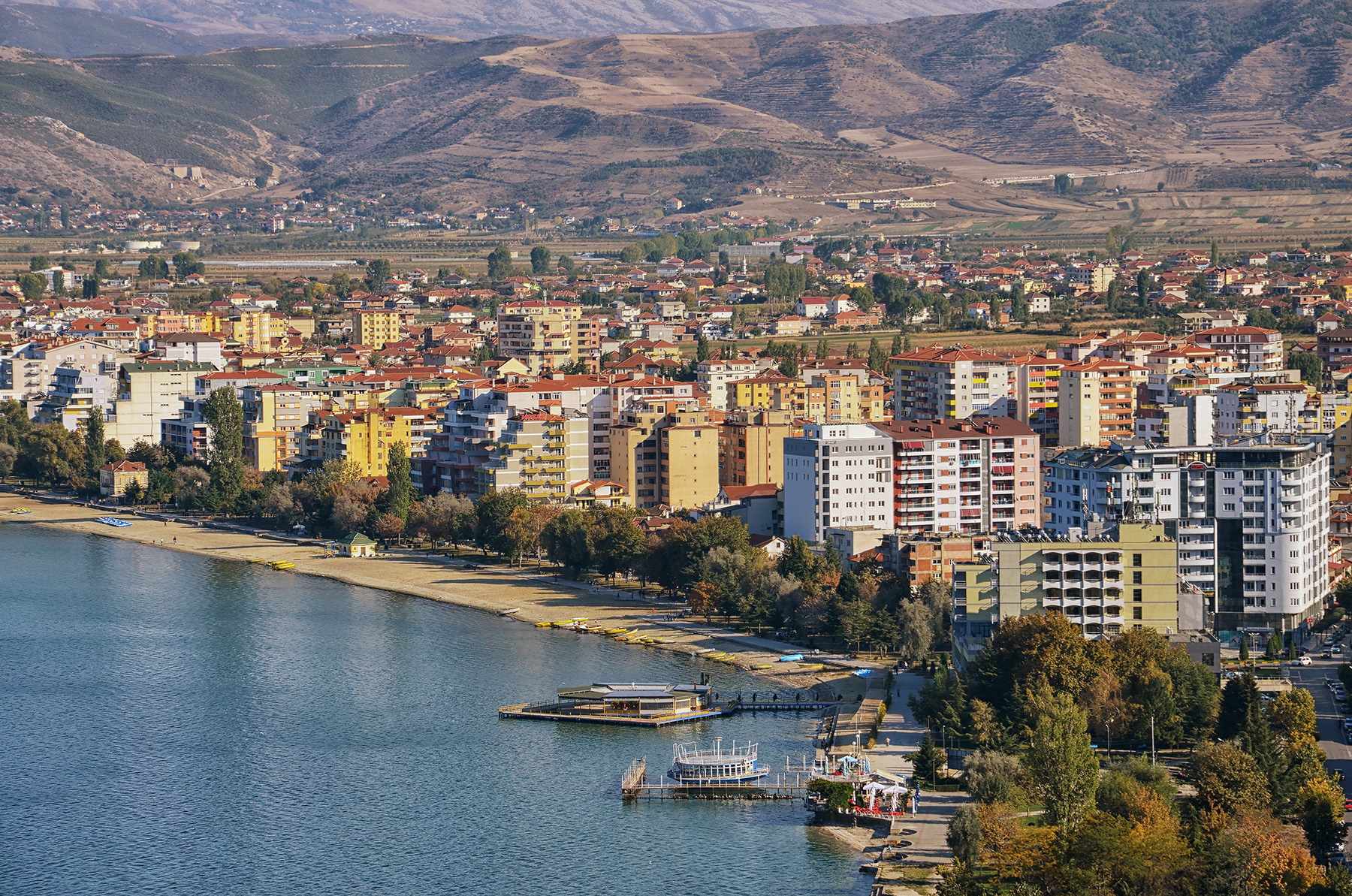
Pogradec is situated on Lake Ohrid

Historical population
Year	Pop.	±%
1950	176,997	—
1960	192,630	+8.8%
1969	228,675	+18.7%
1979	267,378	+16.9%
1989	311,448	+16.5%
2001	265,182	−14.9%
2011	220,357	−16.9%
2023	173,091	−21.4%

According to the last national census from 2023, the county has 173,091 inhabitants. The county is 90.5% Albanian, 0.88% Macedonian, 0.42% Greek, 0.29% Bulgarian, 0.26% Aromanian, 0.67% Romani, 1.12% Balkan Egyptians, and the rest to an assortment of smaller ethnic groups.

=== Religion ===
Between the 2011 and 2023 censuses in Korçë, there were notable shifts in religious affiliation. The Sunni Muslim population decreased significantly from 59.0% to 49.0%, while Bektashi Muslim more than doubled, rising from 2.1% to 4.6%. The Catholic Christian population declined from 1.1% to 0.6%, and Orthodox Christians saw a slight decrease from 16.3% to 16.2%. Evangelical Christians tripled their share, rising from 0.3% to 0.9%.

There was a substantial increase in the irreligious population: atheists nearly doubled their share, rising from 1.8% to 3.5%, and those identifying as believers without denomination grew significantly from 6.8% to 11.6%. Meanwhile, the "Not stated/other" category saw a slight increase, rising from 12.6% to 13.4%.

Population of Korçë according to religious group (2011–2023)
Religion group	Census 2011		Census 2023 (Revised Source)		Difference (2023−2011)	
Religion group	Number	Percentage	Number	Percentage	Number	Percentage
Sunni Muslim	129,964	59.0%	84,859	49.0%	-45,105	-10.0%
Bektashi Muslim	4,558	2.1%	7,910	4.6%	+3,352	+2.5%
Total Muslim	134,522	61.1%	92,769	53.6%	-41,753	-7.5%
Catholic Christian	2,492	1.1%	1,084	0.6%	-1,408	-0.5%
Orthodox Christian	35,814	16.3%	28,003	16.2%	-7,811	-0.1%
Evangelical	660	0.3%	1,546	0.9%	+886	+0.6%
Total Christian*	39,088	17.7%	30,979	17.9%	-8,109	+0.2%
Atheists	4,007	1.8%	6,088	3.5%	+2,081	+1.7%
Believers without denomination	15,078	6.8%	20,007	11.6%	+4,929	+4.8%
Total Non-religious	19,085	8.7%	26,095	15.1%	+7,010	+6.4%
Not stated / other**	27,662	12.6%	23,248	13.4%	-4,414	+0.8%
TOTAL	220,357	100%	173,091	100%	-47,266	–

== See also ==
- Geography of Albania
- Politics of Albania
- Divisions of Albania
