= Gender inequality in Honduras =

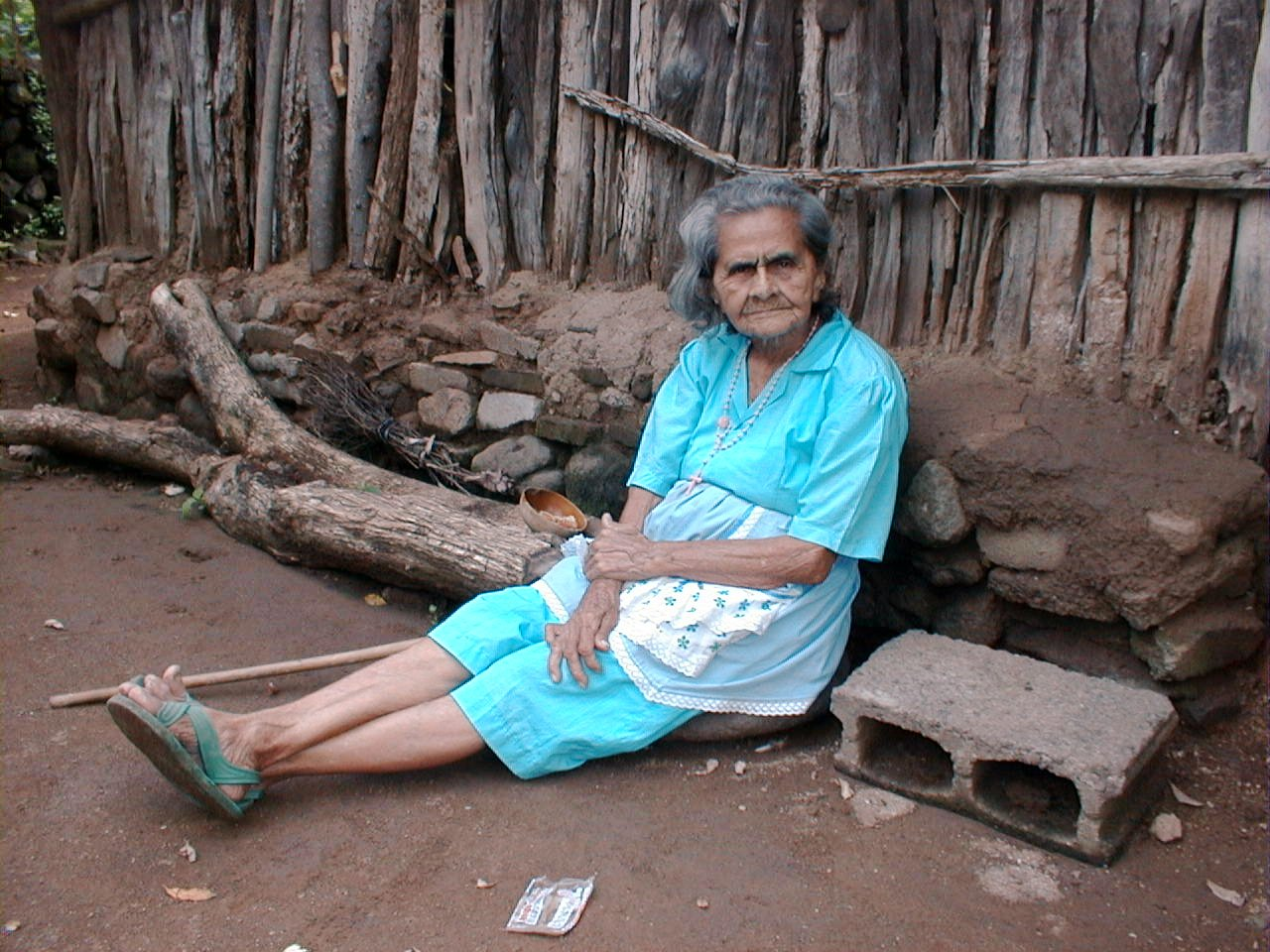
An old Honduran woman resting at the road side in San Ramon Choluteca.

Gender inequality in Honduras has seen improvements in some areas regarding gender inequality, while others have regressed towards further inequality since in 1980s. Comparing numbers from the 2011 and 2019 United Nations Human Development Reports helps to understand how gender inequality has been trending in Honduras. In the 2011 Human Development Report rankings for the Gender Inequality Index, Honduras ranked 121st out of 187 countries. In the 2019 Human Development Report Honduras dropped to 132nd out of 189 countries in the rankings. As the country's overall ranking dropped, it indicates that progress towards gender equality is not being made on the same level as other countries around the world.

Many of the inequalities stem from longstanding cultural norms and traditions that have been in place for hundreds of years. Dating back to the Spanish colonial influence on the agricultural society of pre-16th century Mesoamerica.

== Traditional gender roles in Honduras ==
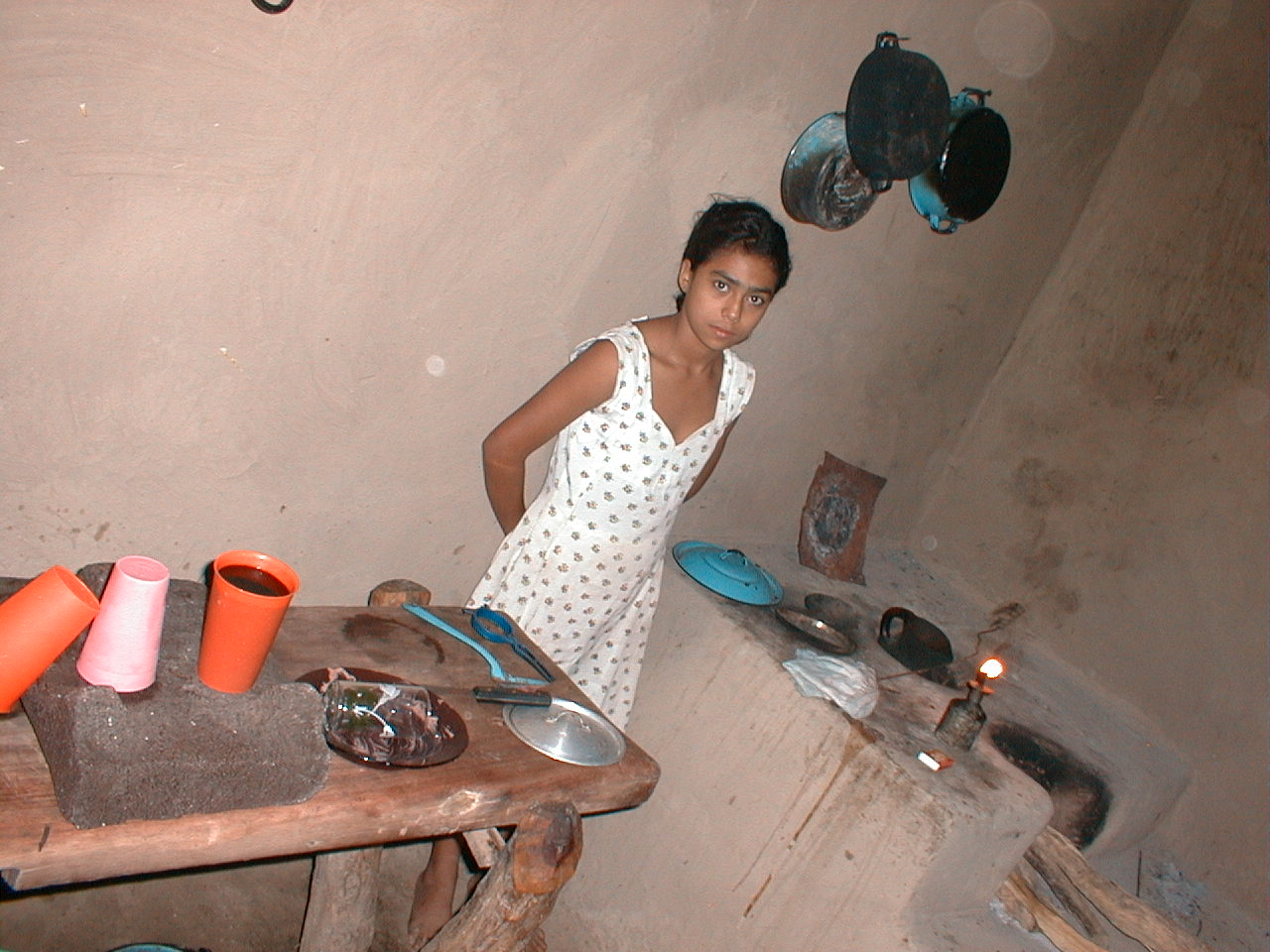
A Honduran girl. Honduran traditional societal norms dictate a primarily domestic role for girls and women.

Traditional gender roles have men dominating the public sphere and women occupying the domestic sphere: it is very taboo for women to participate in what are believed to be traditionally male positions in society. Although, there are women who occupy these traditionally male dominated position, the representation is extremely low. Men are expected to be the main provider of the family and head of the household. Traditional gender roles can give men power to make important decisions over women such as when they may procreate, how many children women may have, what chores need to be done to maintain the household, if they may receive education, and whether or not they may participate in the workforce.

Gender roles in which men occupy more space and hold more power, is taught at a very young age. As children, boys are free to run around unclothed, play without supervision, are less often disciplined for unfavorable behaviors, and enjoy greater freedom overall. While girls are to be well groomed and dressed with care, are watched over carefully, are expected to act in a helpful and quiet manner, and enjoy very little freedom.

Honduran men are expected to father many children, and there is little social stigma attached to men's premarital and extramarital sexual relationships. However, when marrying a woman, men expect their bride to be a virgin. As seen in various news reports, women who do not conform to what is socially deemed as appropriate behavior are often subjected to violence. In 2018 Honduras had 388 cases of femicide (according to Merriam Webster Dictionary femicide is a gender-based murder of a woman or girl by a man) - an average of 32 women killed per month.

According to UNAH Violence Observatory statistics, killings of women decreased from 9.1 deaths per 100,000 in 2016 to 8.2 per 100,000 in 2018, and to 7.9 per 100,000 as of June. Women in domestic situations were the most vulnerable group, accounting for approximately 40 percent of these deaths.

== Gender Inequality Index (GII) ==
Each year the United Nations releases a Human Development Report and in this report they measure various dimensions of society. One of those dimensions is gender inequality where levels of disadvantage between genders is demonstrated. This index shows disadvantages among genders in three key elements: reproductive health, empowerment, and labor market. Countries are given a rank based on their gender inequality index value. The value is measured from 0 to 1. 0 represents men and women prospering equally and 1 being the opposite, in which one gender prospers as poorly as possible compared to the other.

In the 2011 UN Human Development Report Honduras was ranked 121st out of 187 countries and given an index value of 0.511 However, in the 2019 report that ranking dropped to 132nd out of 189 countries, but the opposite trend for the index value, which improved to 0.479. These statistics can give a general idea of how a country fares on gender inequality overall and if improvements are being made, relative to all 187 countries in the report.

As the index value moved closer to 0 by 0.032, this indicates that the country is indeed making improvements, although small, toward gender equality. However, the drop in ranking shows that Honduras is not making strides towards gender equality on the same scale as other countries that moved ahead.

=== Reproductive health ===
Reproductive health is usually gauged in terms of the maternal mortality rate, which is the number of mothers per 100,000 who die from pregnancy-related causes. In 2019, Honduras had a rate of 129 deaths/100,000 live births. Many of these deaths come as a result of lack of adequate healthcare and illegally performed abortions which leave the women at great risk for infection. Another indicator is the adolescent birth rate. This is the number of live births per 1,000 adolescent mothers (ages 15–19). In 2019, Honduras had a rate of 72.9%. This high statistic stems from the machismo culture in which premarital sexual experience are highly sought after by men, lack of sexual education and contraceptives, and a weak healthcare system.

Women who have children as adolescents put their children in a situation where they are much more likely to be raised in poverty, due to the fact that the secondary education dropout rate is significantly higher among adolescents who have children. The UN Human Development Report also shows that as of 2011 only 65 percent of women ages 15–49 use any form of contraception and only 67% of women have a skilled professionals present for the birth of their child (this data was not included in the 2019 report). 50% of young, sexually active, never-married women use contraceptives, while 56% of their married counterparts use contraceptives.

This low rate of contraception use has not equated to a high prevalence of HIV/AIDS. Only 0.2 percent of women and 0.3 percent of men are infected. Having fewer women than men infected with AIDS is usually a trend found in more developed countries. Although, according to Sister Namibia, "the sale of young girls and women into prostitution slavery plays a major role in the transmission of AIDS among heterosexual couples." This practice is leading to an increase in cases of AIDS. Only 33% of girls ages 15–19 reported having a complete understanding of HIV/AIDS. The percentage of girls with completed knowledge on HIV/AIDS is higher in urban areas than rural areas (42% vs 23%) and even higher for women in wealthy households versus the poorest (48% vs 12%).

The final contributing factor to reproductive health is the number of children women have; total fertility rate. The most recent statistics from the Central Intelligence Agency (CIA), states that the total fertility rate in Honduras is 2.33 children born/woman (2024 est.). However, almost 45% of recent births by mothers under 20 was reported to be unplanned, in that they wanted to wait until a later time or did not want it at all.

=== Reproductive and sexual rights ===
Nearly 50% of young women between the ages of 18 and 24 reported becoming sexually active, poorer women at higher rates. Access to birth control is typically more available to married women between the ages of 18 and 24 and to women who live in urban rather than rural areas. In regards to women's understanding of safe sex practices in Honduras, nine in ten women ages 15–19 report knowing where to get a condom. Inequalities in availability are present when some women may not be able to afford condoms or do not have the freedom to purchase them because of their partner or parents control on their sexual health. The highest formal awareness is among the wealthiest of teens, and the least amount of awareness is among the poorest.

Abortion has been illegal in Honduras since it was banned in 1997. Additionally, the Honduran Supreme Court banned the use of emergency contraceptives in 2012, making the unlawful administering or receiving of it punishable in the same way as abortion. Teenagers must also have parental consent in order to be tested for HIV/AID.

The government made an effort to increase the number of schools that provide sexual education beginning in 2010 by signing the Ministerial Declaration of Preventing through Education. Although, according to data collected by The International Federation of Planned Parenthood, since signing this declaration Honduras has only progress by 51% in their efforts of "prevention through education." They were not far off the percentage of regional aggregate progress which was 58%.

=== Empowerment ===
The UN Human Development Index includes two measures as indicators of empowerment. These indicators are the percentage of parliament seats held by women compared to men, and the percentage of women (over 25) with a least some secondary education compared to men. In 2019, women were reported to hold 21.1% of seats in parliament, which was a 3.1% increase from 2011. Regarding percentages for each gender with some secondary education, in 2011 women trailed men with 31.9% compared to their 36.6%. But in 2019 women surpassed men with 34.2% of women over 25 having some secondary education, while men had 32.6%. These statistics suggest that women not only have more opportunities to obtain secondary education, but also have the ability to take advantage of those opportunities.

A common form of empowerment is through political channels. Despite the fact that women today have equal political rights, they remain severely under-represented in politics. One reason for this is women's constant fight for survival keeping them out of organized labor parties where their grievances could potentially be heard. If people want their plight to be recognized, they typically need an organized movement to get the governments attention. Another reason being that those holding political power currently, majority men, are not willing the back women in their political pursuits and/or are not ready to change the political power structure in the country. There is not a lack of participation or interest by women in politics, however their likelihood of being elected into office is very slim.

Perhaps the most telling statistic on empowerment, the question "who is the decision maker" was posed to families in Honduras and 91.3% of those people answered the man was the primary decision maker vs. 8.7% female. This response suggests that the root of the gender inequality issue in Honduras is the idea of patriarchy being the only way to operate and that women should always be the followers and caregivers, but not the decision makers. This insight into the culture of Honduras may be the key to development. Countries cannot simply stop in their tracks and change. It is only through the merging of old and new in the most seamless way that true and lasting change can be achieved.

== Economic activity ==
Economic activity in the GII is based on only one statistic: the proportion of females compared to males in the labor force. As of 2023, women made 40.1% of the labor force in Honduras. Many women work in low-skilled jobs, often in bad conditions. Honduran women have a much lower participation in the workforce than other Latin American women, due to Honduras being more conservative than other countries in the region. The labour opportunities in rural areas are very limited for women, owing to a combination of lack of jobs and social views which dictate that women belong in the home.

In the 2008 Global Gender Gap Index, Honduras was ranked 21st out of 74 countries on their general index value. Pulled from the same data but for the economic participation, in the opportunity sub-index they were ranked 47th. That is a change of 26 spots when talking about general-well being versus economic inclusion. This is yet another indicator that gender inequality is lower in economic dimensions of society.

There has been a recent wave of immigration consisting mostly of young women moving from rural to urban areas in order to find work. This has led to urban centers in Honduras being made up of over 53% women. According to Sister Namibia this has resulted in "rapid urban growth in recent years has spawned various social problems, including unemployment, lack of adequate housing and basic services, all of which affect women most severely."

=== Labor Force Participation ===
Men are twice as likely to be employed in Honduras as are women, and there are very strong stereotypes of what men's and women's jobs should be. Much of this comes from the Mesoamerican ideas of gender. Gender role stereotypes are reinforced from a young age. Boys are given machetes and girls are given meteates (the instrument women use to grind corn into meal).

Rural women carry out very important roles in agricultural life, but are prohibited from stepping out of those boundaries. Women cook, clean, plant crops and even tend animals, but only men are allowed to plow the fields. These roles from ancient culture are still evident even today - women are seen as limited on what they can and can't accomplish. The idea of male and female jobs also carries over into the field of unpaid labor, as women perform a great deal more unpaid labor than men.

In the 2011 Human Development Reports the participation in labor force rate for women (numbers from 2009) was 40.1% while for men the rate was 80.2%. Forward to the 2019 report, (numbers from 2018) the rate for women increased to 47.2% and the same trend, but a smaller increase for men; a 3.5% increase to 83.7%. Although women have seen an increase in labor force participation in the past few decades, that is not necessarily an indication of equality in the labor force. This slow transition for women from unpaid to paid labor is a step in the right direction, but there is still much to be done in the battle for equal pay, jobs, and treatment. Women, in addition to having to work twice as hard in order to get a traditionally male-held job, are then paid less than their male counterparts for doing exactly the same job. Women are seen as a second choice as breadwinner in the home. They are preferred to stay home, work as homemakers, and become dependent on their dominant husbands. This gender role is carried into the workplace, making women secondary priority as employees.

Although women are seen as a second choice for a breadwinner, it is becoming more and more common for women to be the main, and in many cases the sole breadwinner. Yoked with this burden of providing for a family while living in a country where one's labor is not valued can be extremely difficult. This has forced many women to be innovative and flexible when it comes to providing for their families.

Many resort to operating food carts or peddling cheap merchandise on street corners. While this is a way to feed a family, it is also detrimental to the cause for women and plays a part in widening the gender gap even further. Overall the average woman makes considerably less than her male counterpart, and is usually forced into industries with little to no benefits and almost no job security.

=== Wealth distribution by gender ===
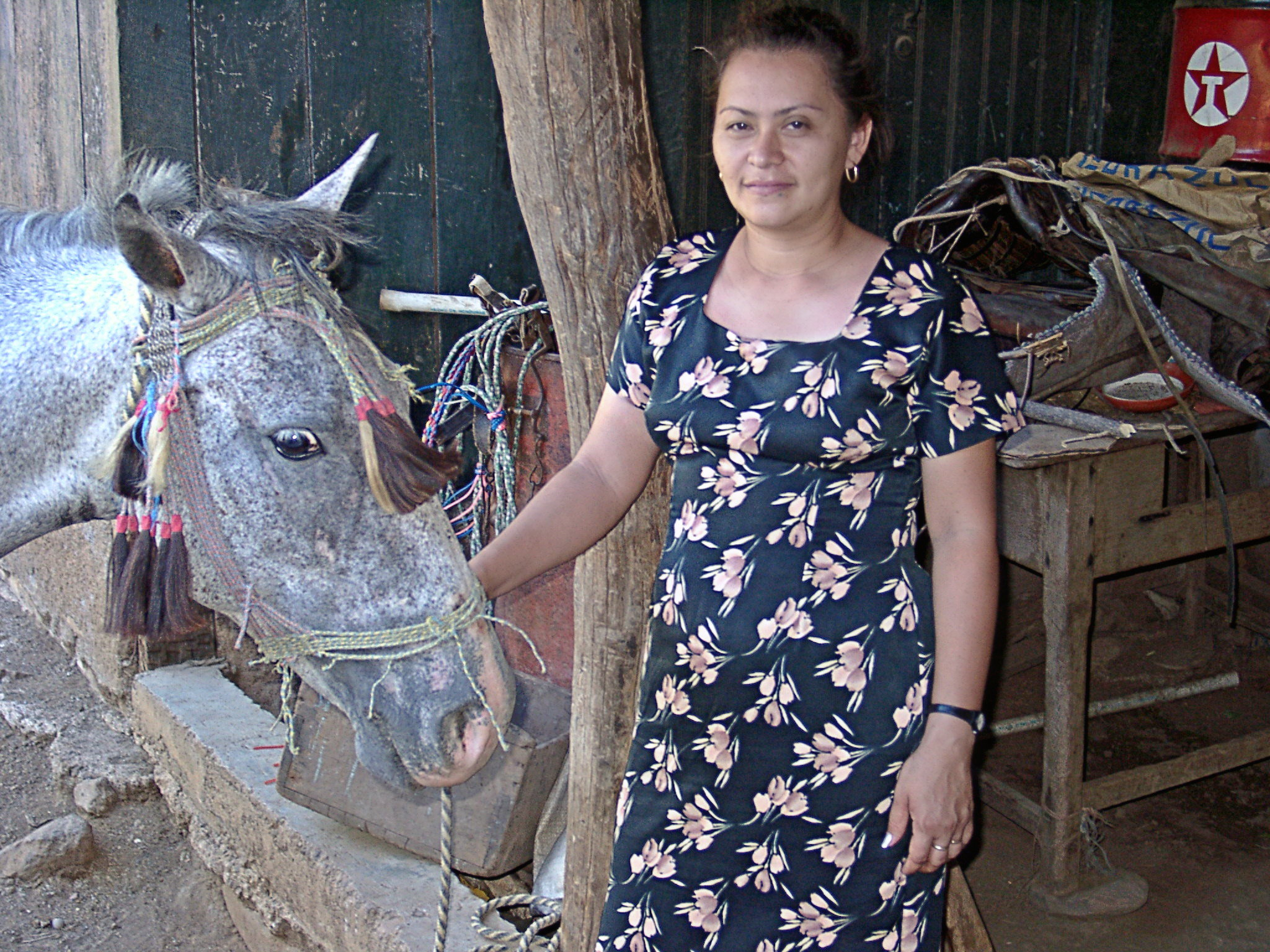
Woman with horse

The share of wealth that a certain group has can be a strong indicator of the amount of power that particular group holds in society. Women in Honduras have a very small share of the overall wealth, and the distribution of the type of wealth women possess reinforces their roles as homemakers and caretakers. This data shows the ratios of ownership of various goods:

Ownership by Gender
| Category | Men | Women | Joint |
|---|---|---|---|
| Home | 59% | 38% | 3% |
| Land | 87.2% | 12.8% | 0% |
| Cattle | 72% | 13% | 15% |
| Work animals | 85% | 10% | 5% |

Women have a slight edge in ownership over chickens and pigs, but the place where women clearly have more ownership is in consumer durables. They tend to own more sewing machines, blenders, irons, stoves, toasters, and fridges, whereas men tend to own the computers, bikes, motorcycles, and cars. The assets that are predominantly owned by the women are of relatively small value compared to the high-value items that are owned almost exclusively by the men. Additionally, the items owned predominantly by the women all revolve around household care.

The underlying message given here is that in general, women own the chickens and the pigs, because they can then prepare them into a meal. They also own the items necessary to sew, blend, iron, cook, bake, and prepare and serve food. They do not, however, have the assets necessary to gain physical mobility through the means of owning a car or bicycle, check email, or cultivate a field, while the men do. This distribution of ownership reinforces the stereotypical and traditional gender roles in society.

== Women's access to education ==
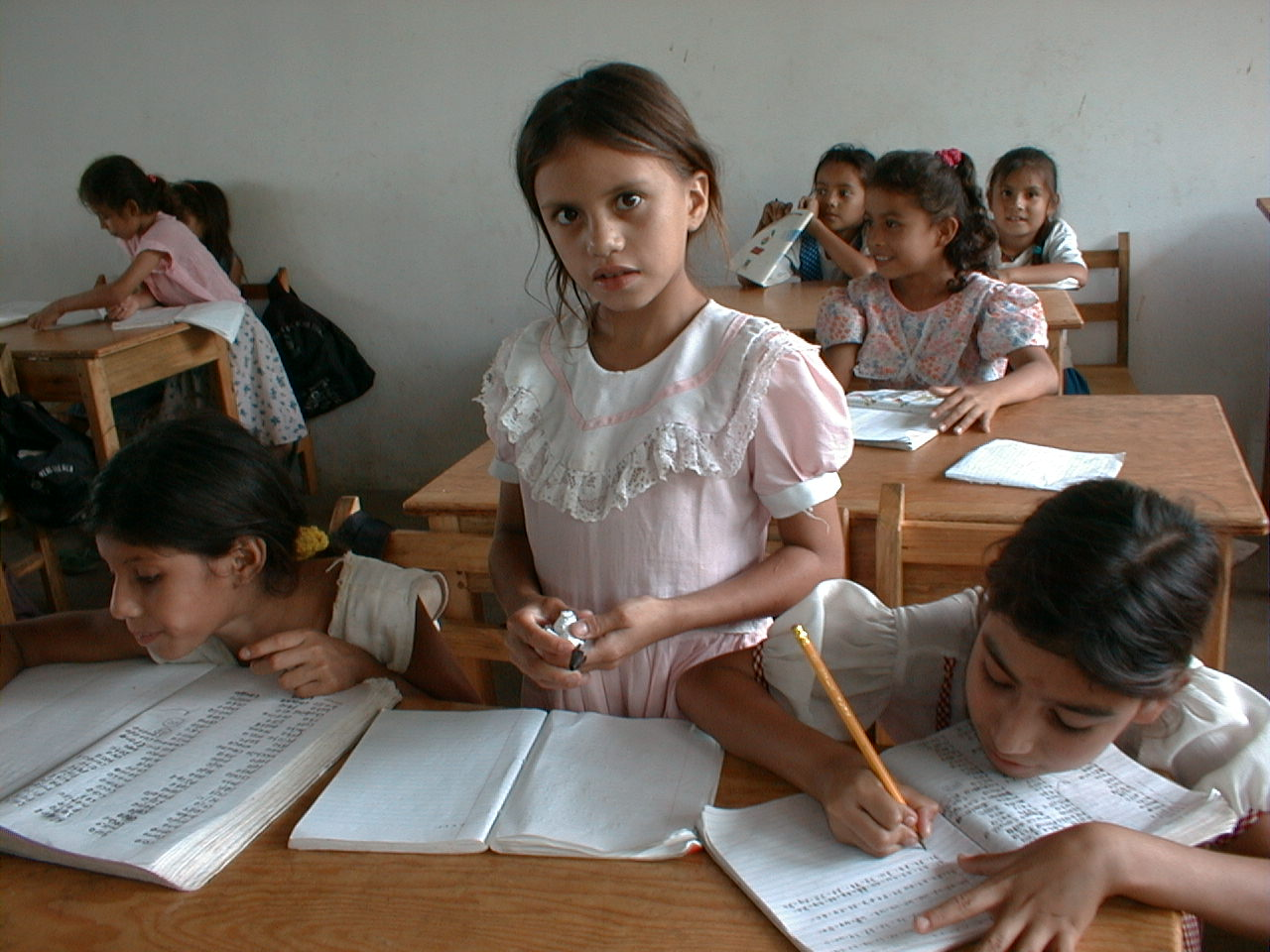
School girls in Honduras.

Due to the traditionally patriarchal nature of Honduras, girls are often educationally disadvantaged. The reason for this being that if times got tough and only one child in a family was going to be educated, any female children would lose their chance at education before the boys. This is due to the fact that it is much harder for a female to find work regardless of educational achievement. The sought-after, well-paying jobs are commonly associated with masculinity in Honduras, including heavy manual labor, technical work, and anything that requires extensive training or an advanced degree.

The main reason that girls are pulled out of school in the first place is usually to help in the family, leading to differences in educational attainment. The situation is changing, as the school life expectancy is today estimated to be higher for girls (11 years) than boys (10 years) -as of 2019. Honduras does have a fairly high literacy rate, which is similar for both sexes: 88.2% for males and 88.7% for females.

== Gender-based violence ==
Violence against women occurs in public and in private, and demonstrates the inequality of power between women and men. Femicide rates are extremely high in Honduras, as well as rates of physical and sexual violence.

The most common form of gender-based violence is sexual in nature. Understandably, sexual violence involves exploitation and abuse and is related "to any act, attempt, or threat that results in physical and emotional harm". Sexual violence can occur in the family, through rape or marital rape, coercion, by attempt, in the form of harassment and as a weapon of war or torture.

Harmful traditional practices of gender based violence include female genital mutilation (FGM), early marriage, forced marriage, honor killing and maiming (murdering a woman as a punishment for dishonoring or bringing shame to the family), infanticide, and denial of education.

Socio-economic violence involves discrimination or denial of opportunities, social exclusion based on sexual orientation, and obstructive legislative practice (inhibiting women from using their social or economic rights).

=== Femicide ===
Femicide is the murdering of females and women, often solely due to their gender. In Honduras, the rate of femicide is rated 6th out of 111 countries according to a 2011 study. Femicides make up 9.6% of the total number of homicides in the country. In current years the rates of violence against women have increased. In this country, femicide is extremely brutal. Sometimes bodies are found burned or with the feet and hands tied. During the autopsies, it is often discovered that rape has occurred before the victim's death. In 2022, 297 women were victims of femicide raising the rate of femicide to 6 per 100,000; this number was 4.6 per 100,000 in 2021. The Center for Women’s Rights (Centro de Derechos de Mujeres) has declared 203 femicide murders in Honduras so far in the year 2024. Between 2006 and 2012, femicide rates increased by 300%. 2,264 women were victims of femicide between 2016 and 2021, and 240 women lost their lives violently in 2021, making gender based violence the second leading cause of death for women in Honduras.

=== Impunity ===
Impunity is the lack of punishment and consequences for certain actions or crimes. In Honduras and in many countries surrounding it, justice against femicide does not get served. Although there are women’s rights activists trying to take a stand, "fewer than 3% of reported femicide cases are resolved by the courts". According to Regina Fonseca, a coordinator of The Women's Rights Center, “94% of these cases remained unpunished,” The Honduran government does not have the necessary and appropriate resources available to address the country's increasing violence against women. As of 2018, the country does not have a designated team or program to compile data regarding femicide, making it difficult to form policies and plans to combat femicide.

=== Domestic violence ===
Domestic violence is the abuse or attack on a person, often a woman, by an intimate partner such as a husband. Domestic violence is an issue within Honduran society. An estimated 27 percent of Honduran women report that they have endured some form of physical violence. This may include physical injuries, domestic violence, rape, and homicide.

From 2008 to 2013 domestic violence cases increased 390 percent, with over half of cases expiring before the victim heard back from law enforcement. The Public Prosecutor's office recognizes twenty-five forms of violence inflicted upon Honduran women. The violence against women in Honduras is a result of gender norms, poverty, militarization, drug trafficking, gangs, and inequality. As a result, from the years 2005 through 2013, the numbers of violent death rose by two hundred and sixty-three percent. This made the rate of violent deaths of Honduran women increase from 2.7 in 2005 to 14.6 in 2013. According to the Observatory of Violence of the National Autonomous University of Honduras, between 2019 and 2023, there were 11,813 registered cases of sexual violence, with 89% of cases being women and girls, and 10% being men. The National Emergency System of Honduras registered 38,332 reports of domestic violence and 59,147 reports of intimate partner violence in 2022.

The Domestic Violence Act took effect after a long struggle by women's rights activists to get it passed. It is the only form of legislation in place that directly addresses violence against girls and women. This legislation was focused on dealing with violence in the home, an issue which was largely overlooked by local authorities. The Domestic Violence Act would have resulted in a crackdown on domestic violence by the police, but the judicial and social systems needed adjustments to deal with the changes. In 1997, the act was passed and the authorities were charged with the difficult task of dealing with such a widespread and controversial issue. In order to deal with new court cases, special domestic violence judges were assigned to handle the new caseload. Since 1998 the National Women's Institute (Institutio Nacional de Mujer) has focused on creation, development, promotion, and implementation of policies that are designed to protect the lives of girls and women.

The act was inspired by the Convention on the Elimination of All Forms of Discrimination Against Women, as well as other international organizations in support of women's rights, and had a main goal of reducing violence towards women in Honduras. There was also a network of therapists, charged with providing family counseling to those that were affected by the bill. Men who were sanctioned by the bill were also monitored to reduce the chances of future violence. The bill started off only being enforced around the capital and other major cities, but quickly spread throughout all of Honduras. This was a major step in reducing the frequency and acceptability of gender violence in Honduras.

=== Physical & Sexual Violence ===
Physical and Sexual violence is the intentional abuse or harm to a person intending to physically harm them or sexually violate them. Physical and sexual violence in Honduras are prominent issues. Rape is the most common form of sexual violence in Honduras. The rate of physical and/or sexual violence was 17% in 2022, according to the Social Institutions and Gender Index.^{[needs citation]} One of the most reported crimes is sexual assault in Honduras. About 61% complaints from women were sexual assault complaints. Justice for survivors of sexual violence is limited. Out of all the cases, 94.5% of perpetrators are not held responsible.

According to UNICEF, as the U.S. Ambassador to Honduras stated in a Gender-Based Violence Compact Signing with the Ministry of Foreign Affairs of Honduras, 63% of children and adolescents suffer sorts of physical and/or psychological abuse at the hands of a caregiver as of 2019. Children's rights in Honduras are frequently violated in Honduras, between 2013 and 2019 a child was murdered every 27 hours according to a 2020 UNICEF Report. In addition to that, 4 sex crimes occur every day in Honduras against young women. This contributes to rates of school truancy in Honduras; 23.9% of girls aged 13-17 years miss school due to acts of physical violence, and 21.2% of adolescent girls miss school due to acts of sexual violence.

=== Cultural Violence ===
Cultural Violence is a form of structural violence, where cultural norms are used to allow the inflicting of direct or structural violence. In Honduras, Machismo culture is very widespread. Machismo is an expression of patriarchy, and is a view that women should be controlled by men. Gender roles are strictly enforced, and there is a normalization of gender based violence.

== History of women's rights ==
Women's organizations have been in existence since the 1920s, when the Women's Cultural Society (Sociedad Cultural Feminina Hondureña) was formed and began to fight for women's rights. One leader, Visitación Padilla, actively opposed U.S. intervention in Honduras in 1924. Women also played important roles in the development of the labor movement, which became particularly active in the 1950s. According to Gladys Lanza, a trade union activist, women were extremely active in the 1954 national banana workers strike.

They controlled entrances to towns and markets, closed the bars so men could not get drunk, and ran collective kitchens. Despite the extent of this logistical work, there was not a single woman on the strike committee. In the 1950s women also became active in the fight for women's suffrage, which was obtained in 1955. The current Constitution of Honduras enshrines gender equality: art 60 reads: "Any discrimination on grounds of sex, race, class and any other injuries to human dignity are declared punishable". (Se declara punible toda discriminación por motivo de sexo, raza, clase y cualquier otra lesiva a la dignidad humana).

Currently, there are designated groups and organizations dedicated to empowering and fighting for the lives of women and girls, from the United Nations Women to hundreds of nonprofits.

== Women in politics ==
Nevertheless, the numbers have increased in recent years. According to the United Nations Human Development Indexes, in the percentage of women holding seats in national parliament was 18.0%, following an increase in 2015 which women made up 25.80% of the Parliament. However, in the 2019 Human Development Index the percentage of women holding seats in the national parliament saw a decrease down to 21.2%. There have been many international conventions and affirmative actions measures signed with the intention of creating more political representation for women, but that has not happened. Men in political power are unlikely to offer support these institutional changes, out of fear for changing the status quo, having their own political agendas hindered, and a refusal to share power.

== Impacts of migration on women ==
In Honduras, there are many transnational families: members of the family (typically males) migrate to other countries, usually seeking economic opportunities. A decent number of Hondurans had been living in the United States since the 1950s, but this number increased significantly starting in the 1990s and 2000s. In 2010, there were about 523,000 Hondurans residing in the United States, the majority of which were individuals rather than whole families. That number increased significantly to 1,100,000 Hondurans residing in the United States in 2021. As a result of this mass migration, the Hondurans who still reside in Honduras rely heavily on remittances. Remittances have been a greater source of domestic income than any other sector of the economy of Honduras since 2000: twenty percent of Honduran households were receiving remittances. Statistics reveal that men are much more likely to migrate than women. Eighty percent of Hondurans receiving remittances are women, which demonstrates that more women remain behind than men. The majority of these women are between the ages of 20 and 40. Approximately 40 percent of the remittances come from children, 30 percent from siblings, and 20 percent from spouses. This large-scale migration driven by the need to improve economic situations particularly impacts the women left behind in Honduras.

There are economic, social, and emotional impacts on the women left behind in Honduras as their male family members, such as brothers, husbands, fathers, and sons, migrate to countries such as the United States in order to earn money for their families. These migrations especially affect women who become the head of the household after their family member leaves. Personal interviews and anecdotal evidence reveal that women suffer from significant emotional distress as their loved ones embark on often dangerous journeys. Typically, the men who migrate must stay away and work for several years in order to make enough money to adequately provide for the survival of their family members remaining in Honduras. This long term separation and the worry it gives rise to can be incredibly taxing. Interviews with Honduran women revealed that they typically feel much less safe than their male family members. One Honduran woman had been robbed since the criminals knew her husband had migrated and thus targeted her house. Furthermore, this emotional burden and anxiety manifests itself into physical illnesses.

Not only do the women left behind in Honduras have to deal with emotional (and sometimes physical) strain, but they have more tasks to complete once their male family members migrate. These migrations often significantly increase the amount of work and responsibilities that Honduran women must accomplish and bear. Some of this additional work results from jobs that these women already had but shared with their husbands and brothers. For example, women become the sole caregivers of their children - the great physical distance separating their husbands from their children precludes these men from sharing this responsibility. Additional work comes in the form of the jobs their male family members used to take care of before they migrated. Some Honduran women must not only care for the children and their home, but also tackle additional tasks such as farming and other agricultural jobs.

There are several other ways in which already strongly prevalent gender inequalities in Honduras are exacerbated by the migration of males to countries such as the United States. Often, these men must employ the help of "coyotes" in order to safely cross the border. These "coyotes" require an incredibly large fee: thus, the women left at home become the managers of their husband or other male relative's debt. This inheritance of the debt not only restrains and pressures women financially, but it also increases their emotional stress as it extends the amount of time the men must stay away from home in order to make enough money to provide for their families and pay off this debt.

Additionally, the increase of work for women does not also lead to an increase of political or social power and influence. Thus, women are given an extra burden without being given extra resources, benefits, or support to handle this increased workload. Several Honduran women revealed in interviews that they did not feel more empowered by taking on these additional responsibilities. Not only are their jobs physically, emotionally, mentally, and financially demanding, but these extra jobs were not their choice. Several Honduran women said that if these burdens had been freely chosen rather than thrust on them, they might feel more empowered. Notably, more research needs to be done on the topic of the political impacts on women after the men migrate from Honduras. The effects are likely to differ between rural and urban areas.

=== Recent trends in women migration ===
As the previous part of this section highlights, many Hondurans migrated in the late 20th and very early 21st century for economic reasons, especially after the devastation of Hurricane Mitch in late 1998. However, more recent studies show that more women and children are migrating out of Latin American countries than were previously. This is especially the case for Guatemala, El Salvador, and Honduras. This new trend in migration out of Honduras is caused by an increase in sexual and gender violence, especially from gangs: "gang members are using rape, kidnapping, torture, sexual violence, and other crimes, predominantly against women and girls," in Honduras. In fact, Honduras had the seventh highest rate of gender-motivated murders of women in the world in 2013. Many LGBTQ+ women and children are specifically being targeted by these gangs, as well. Gangs use violence in part as a means to establish control over their territory. This increased violence against women and children have led to their migration to the United States for asylum.

This is a complex issue, as scholars have pointed to many contributing factors. One notable cause of the increased violence and subsequent migration of women and children is the long history of impunity of gang members in Honduras. The government and justice systems are unable to protect the victims of this violence. Fewer than three percent of gender-motivated murders are solved by the courts in the countries of El Salvador, Guatemala, and Honduras. Both corruption and intimidation play a large role, and many people don't report the crimes against them out of fear. When people in Honduras do report these crimes, them and their families are often subjected to further gang violence, which the police and government are largely powerless to prevent.

Not only do women experience violence while in Honduras, but they also suffer from attacks while migrating to the United States and other nations. This indicates that their situation in Honduras is so unlivable that they are willing to risk violence on their journey. Women are sexually and physically abused by other migrants, human smugglers, and even government officials or police. Women take contraception to prevent unwanted pregnancy in case of rape while they migrate, demonstrating the dangers they face and their desperation driving them to escape the violence in their home country.

== See also ==
- Human rights in Honduras
