= Demographics of Albania =

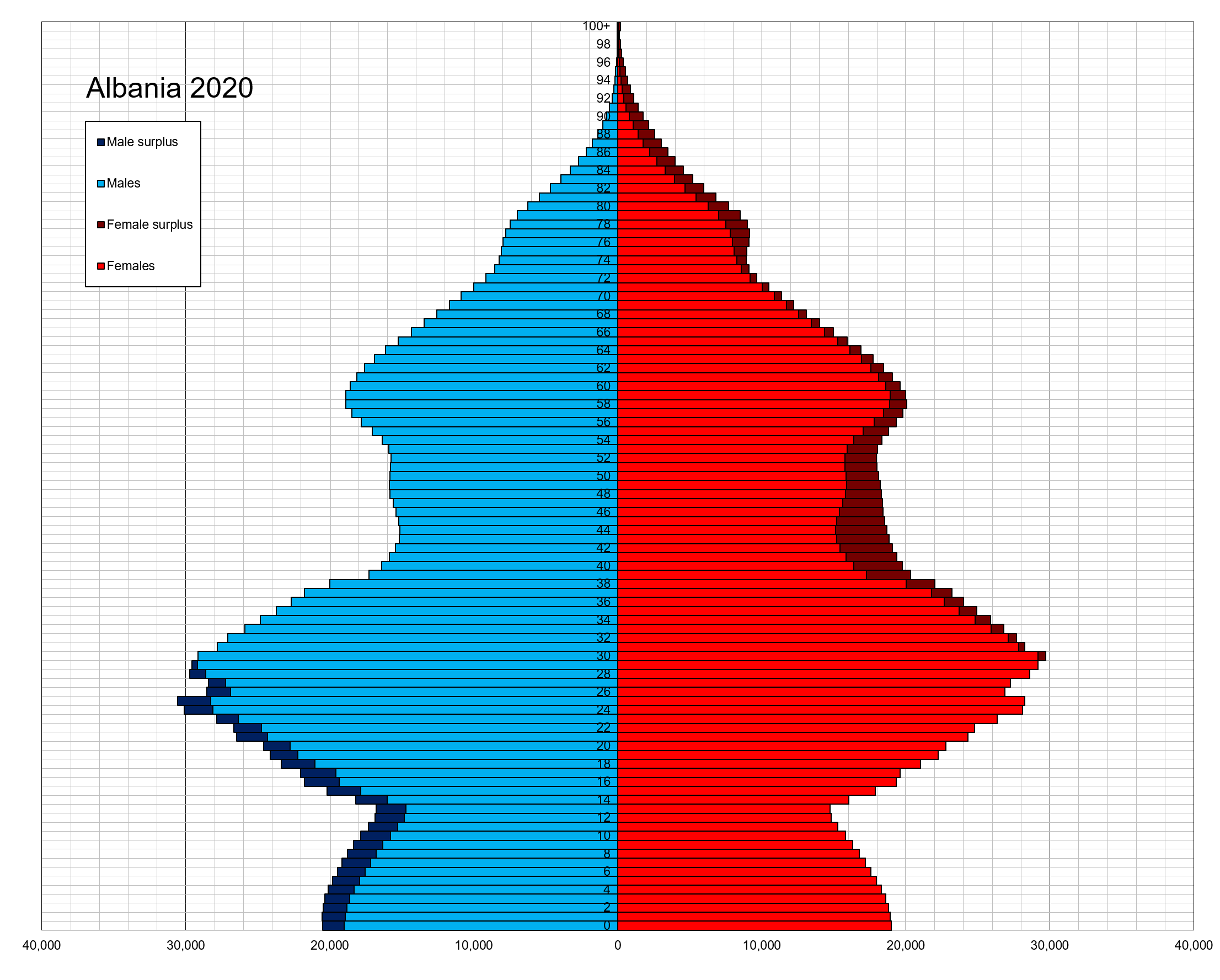
- Population: 2,402,113 (2023 census)
- Growth rate: -1.1%
- Birth rate: 9.7 births/1,000 population (2021)
- Death rate: 10.9 deaths/1,000 population (2021)
- Fertility rate: 1.35 children born/woman (2023 est.)
- Infant mortality: 10.82 deaths/1,000 live births
- Net migration rate: −3.23 migrant(s)/1,000 population (2022 est.)
- Immigrant share: 1.7% (2024)

Age structure
- 0–14 years: 17.6%
- 65 and over: 13.03%

Sex ratio
- Total: 0.97 male(s)/female (2022 est.)
- At birth: 1.07 male(s)/female
- Under 15: 1.1 male(s)/female
- 65 and over: 0.66 male(s)/female

Nationality
- Nationality: Albanian
- Major ethnic: Albanian (91.0%)
- Minor ethnic: Greek (0.98%)

Language
- Official: Albanian

Demographic features of the population of Albania include population density, ethnicity, education level, health of the populace, economic status, religious affiliations and other aspects. The demography of Albania is monitored by the Institute of Statistics of Albania. The institute has performed demographic censuses since the 1920s. The latest census in Albania was performed in September 2023.

Albania is a fairly ethnically and linguistically homogeneous country, with ethnic Albanians forming 91% of the total population in the country. The total population residing in Albania in September 2023 was 2,402,113 according to the most recent INSTAT census.

The first official population statistic for Albania was the 1923 census, when the country had a total of 823,000 inhabitants. Previous censuses were carried out by the Ottoman Empire, but have not been made public. A shift in administrative borders in 1913 make comparison of various periods more complicated. Maddison from 2001, estimates that in Albania about 200,000 people lived up to the year 1600, and that the population grew to 300,000 by 1700, implying an annual average growth rate of 0.4% in that period. However, population growth accelerated from the declaration of independence in 1912 to 1944 to 0.7% per year. After the Second World War, population growth policies pursued by the communist government and a large life expectancy fueled a 2.5% annual increase for the following 45 years. Albania consistently had the highest birth rate and one of the lowest death rates in Europe at the time. This prolonged growth strained economic resources in a Malthusian fashion, contributing to the collapse of the communist regime and the emigration of about 20 to 25 percent of the population in the following two decades. Albania experienced a demographic transition starting from 1960s, when crude birth rates began a slow decline, despite a government policy that called for a population increase. After the 1990s, the population showed an average decline of about 0.3% per year, caused by emigration. In the 2001 Census, the population declined to 3,023,000 from almost 3,300,000 million in 1990.

The permanent population of Albania at the 2023 census had decreased by 420,000 people compared to the 2011 census. The population density in 2023 was 84 inhabitants per square kilometre. The overall life expectancy in Albania at birth was 80.6 years in 2024. In 2011, for the first time in the history of population censuses in Albania, the population in urban areas (53.7%) was larger than the population of rural areas (46.3%).

The Albanian language is the official language, but minority languages are officially used in some local government units. Albanian is declared as the native language by 98.76% of the population. Albanians are amongst the most monolingual people in Europe, with 59.9% of inhabitants only speaking one language. Commonly spoken second languages include Italian, Greek (concentrated in the south) and English, the latter of which is increasing, particularly amongst the youth.

According to the 2023 census, the main religions of Albania are Islam (50.67%), Christianity (16%); of which Roman Catholicism (8.38%), Eastern Orthodoxy (7.22%) and Evangelicism (0.4%), Believers without denomination (13.83%), Atheists (3.55%) and other religions (0.15%) . Additionally, 10.17% of respondents preferred not to answer.

The main ethnic groups in Albania are Albanians (91%), Greeks (1%), Egyptians (0.5%), Romani people (0.4%), Bulgarians (0.3%), as well as Bosniaks, Aromanians, Macedonians, Serbs and Montenegrins.

Albania has a high Human Development Index of 0.810, ranking 71st in the world in 2023. In 2016, Albania had a total population of 2,786,026, 1,361,326 being males and 1,424,700 females. 42,922 inhabitants have left Albania and in the same year the number of immigrants in the country was 25,846.

== Population ==
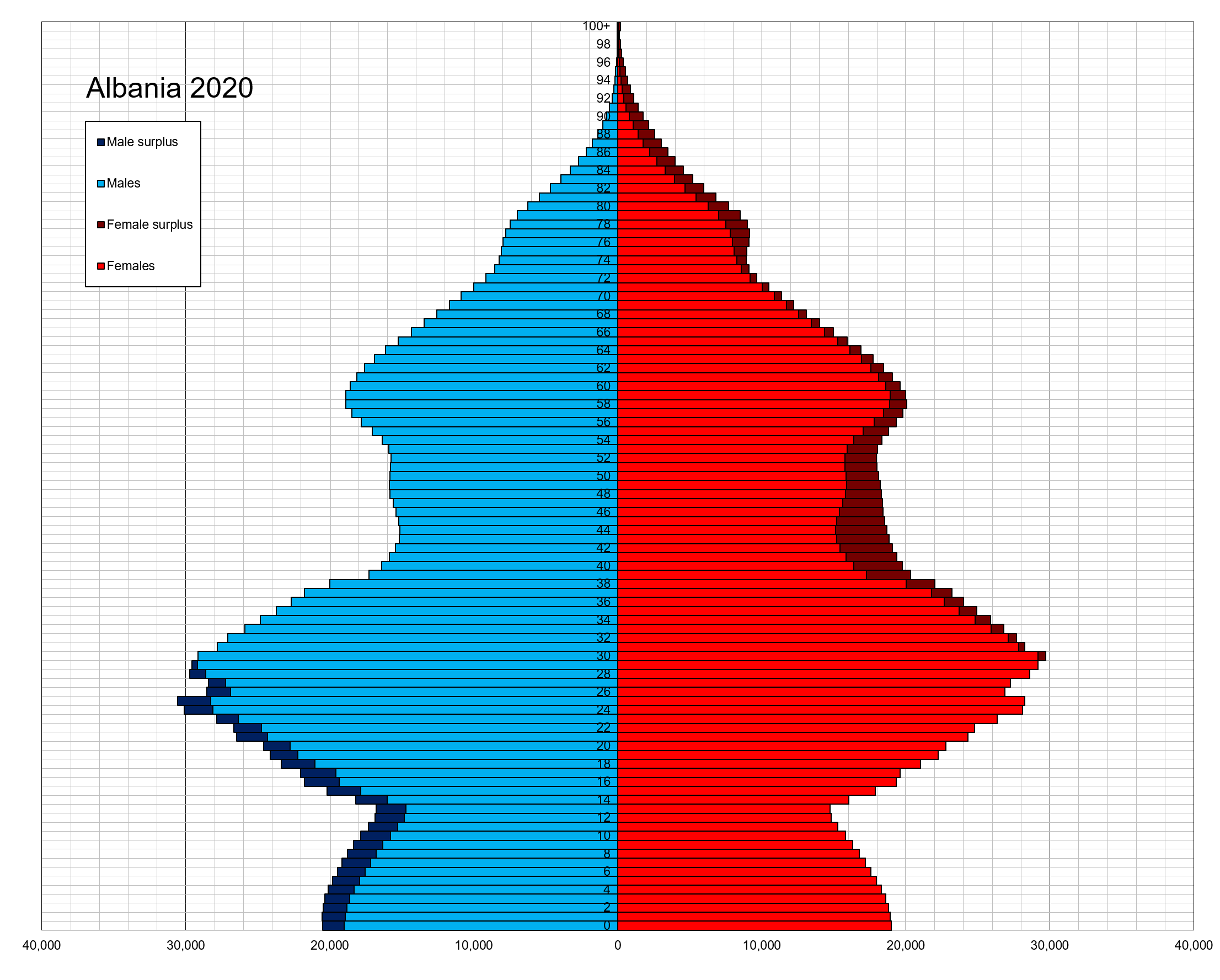
2020 Albanian population pyramid

With an estimated population of 2.36 million in 2025, Albania ranks 142nd in the world by population. The population density is 101 inhabitants per square kilometre. The life expectancy at birth in 2024 was 80 years. The total fertility rate is 1.21 children per mother, the third lowest in Europe after Malta and Spain. There were 23,617 births and 21,286 deaths in Albania in 2023, a positive natural population increase as the number of births exceeded the number of deaths by 2,331. In 2025, the total dependency ratio of population in Albania is 57.1% and the median age is 44.3 years old.

In 2001, the number of households amounted to 726,895. The age structure was under 6 years by 10.8% and 65 years and older by 7.5%. However, the sex ratio amounted to 49.9% males and 50.1% females of the total population. In 2011, the total population was 2,831,741. The comparison of the figures shows that the population has decreased by 7.7% in about ten years. Large scale emigration and fertility decline are supposed to be the main causes of the observed population decrease. A preliminary estimate of the number of persons that refused to participate in the census is 29,355 (1.04%). This figure is based on the number of dwellings for which a refusal was recorded and is included in the total population. The total population is composed of 1,421,810 males (50.2%) and 1,409,931 females (49.8%). For the first time in the history of population censuses in the nation, the population in urban areas is larger than the population of rural areas. According to 2011 census preliminary results, 53.7 percent of the population lives in urban areas and 46.3 percent in rural areas.

The 2011 census is regarded as unreliable and inaccurate by the Council of Europe, showing incompatibility with the protection of national minorities. Also, the World Council of Churches sent letters to the United Nations Human Rights Council regarding the matter, having conducted their own questionnaire which showed major irregularities. It was the first census to include ethnicity, was struck by controversy since according to article 20 of the Census law, there is a $1,000 fine for anyone who declares anything other than what was written down on the individual's birth certificate. Some of the minorities, mainly the Greeks, boycotted the census. In 2024, the religious affiliation in Albania was 36.5% Muslims, 33.8% Irreligious believers, 8% Orthodox Christians, 7.9% Catholics, 7.2% Atheists and Agnostics, 5.2% Bektashi and 1.2% Protestants.

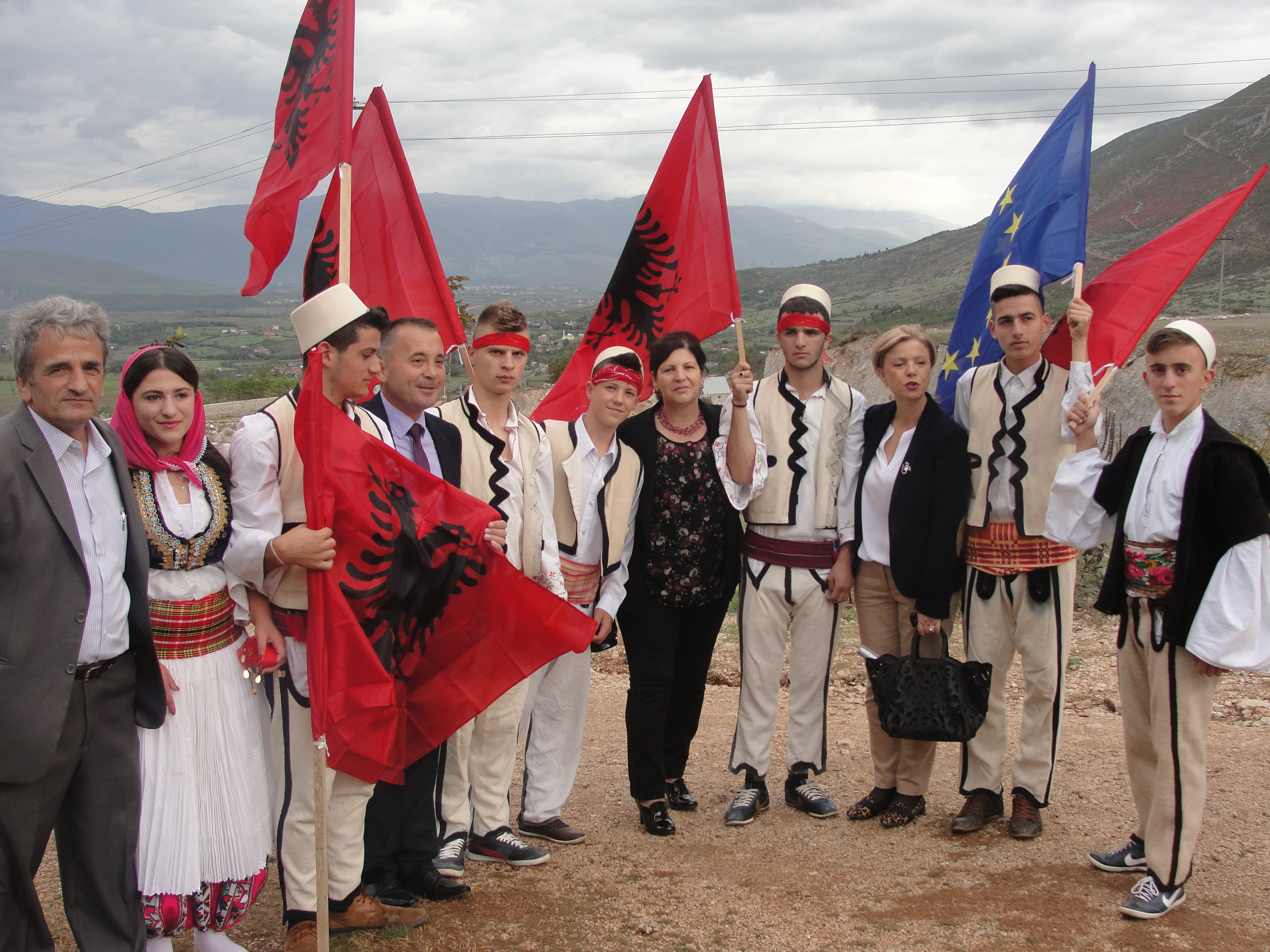
Albanians

Tirana County is the area with the highest population of 811,649 in the country. Fier County remains the population with the second highest population with a total of 312,488. The Counties with the lowest result are Gjirokastër, Kukës and Dibër respectively with 70,331, 84,035 and 134,153 inhabitants. About 53.4% of Albania's population live in cities. The three largest counties account for half of the population.

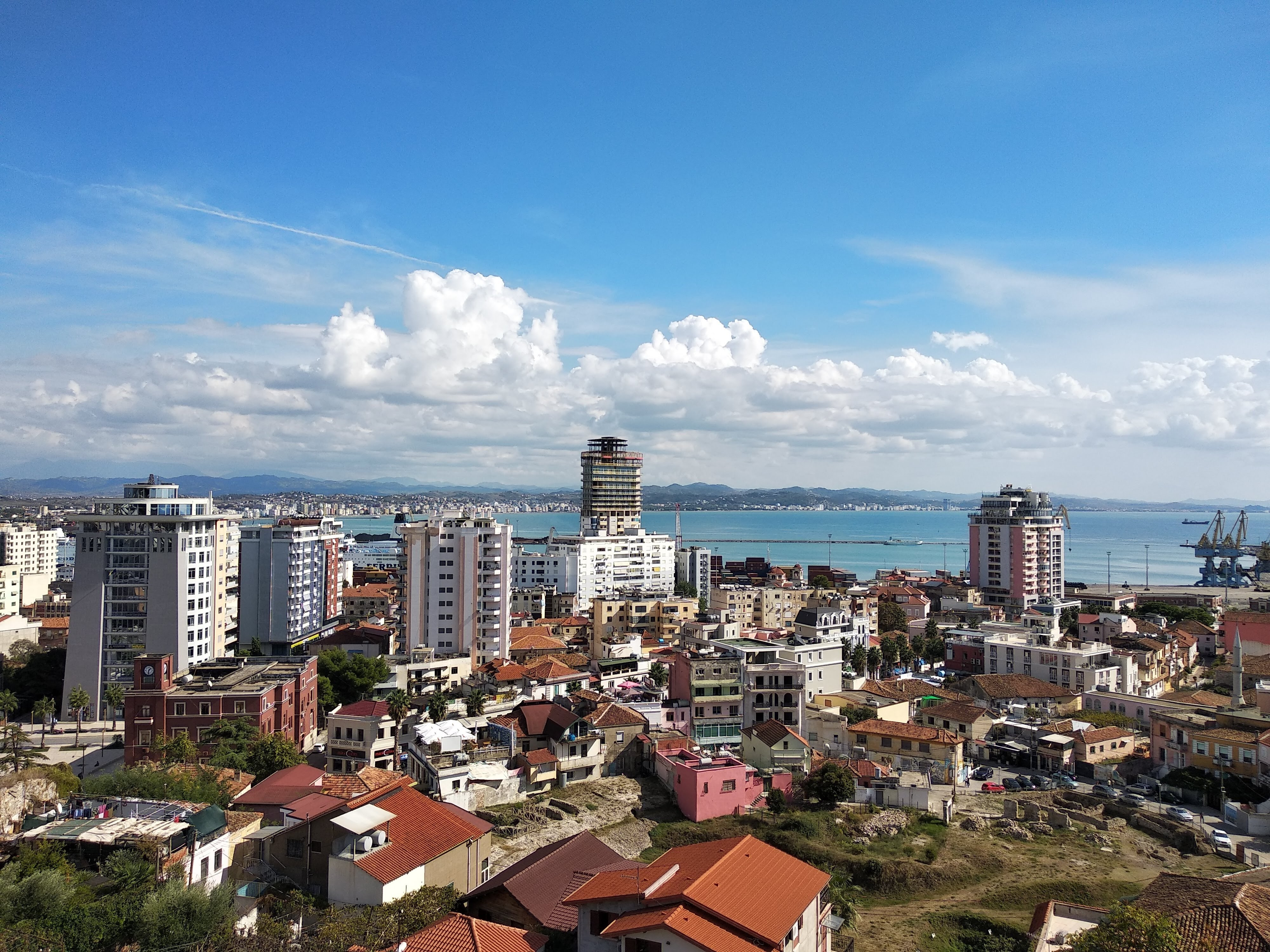
View of Durrës

Almost 53.4% of the population of Albania living in cities. According to the Institute of Statistics (INSTAT), the three largest counties account for half of the population. Over 1 million people live in Tirana and Durrës, making it the largest urban area in Albania. The area of the capital Tirana, is one of largest cities in the Balkan Peninsula and ranks 7th with a population about 800,000. The second largest is the port city of Durrës, with a population of 201.110, followed by Vlorë, the largest city in southern Albania, with 141.513 inhabitants. The Institute of Statistics forecast that the population may even increase by less than a fifth from 763.560 by 2011 to 909.252 by 2031, depending on the actual birth rate and the level of net migration.

View chart definition.
View chart definition.
View chart definition.
View chart definition.

=== Population censuses in 1923–2023 ===
Date	Total population	Change (%)	Males	Females	Population density	Urban population
1923	803,959					
1930	1,003,097					
1940	1,084,159	+8.1				
1945	1,122,044	+3.5%	570,361	551,683	39	
1950	1,218,943	+8.6%	625,935	593,008	42	20.5%
1955	1,391,499	+14.1%	713,316	678,183	48	27.5%
1960	1,626,315	+16.9%	835,294	791,021	57	30.9%
1969	2,068,200	+27.2%			72	31.5%
1979	2,590,600	+25.3%	1,337,400	1,253,200	90	33.5%
1989	3,182,417	+22.9%	1,638,100	1,544,300	111	35.5%
2001	3,069,275	-3.6%	1,530,443	1,538,832	107	42.1%
2011	2,831,741	-7.7%	1,421,810	1,409,931	99	53.7%
2023	2,402,113	-14.8%	1,190,448	1,211,665	84	

=== Population by Qark/County ===
Historical population by Qark/County in Albania (INSTAT)
Qark/County	Population		Change (1989–2023)	
Qark/County	1989	2023	Number	%
Berat	222,901	140,956	−81,945	−36%
Dibër	226,324	107,178	−119,146	−52%
Durrës	218,530	226,863	+8,333	+3%
Elbasan	357,497	232,580	−124,917	−35%
Fier	379,342	240,377	−138,965	−36%
Gjirokastër	155,998	60,013	−95,985	−61%
Korçë	311,448	173,091	−138,357	−44%
Kukës	146,081	61,998	−84,083	−57%
Lezhë	165,254	99,384	−65,870	−39%
Shkodër	285,258	154,479	−130,779	−45%
Tiranë	449,228	758,513	+309,285	+68%
Vlorë	264,556	146,681	−117,875	−44%

=== Total fertility rate by counties ===
==== Before 1934 ====
Years	1925	1926	1927	1928	1929	1930	1931	1932	1933
Total Fertility Rate in Albania	4.60	4.42	4.25	4.07	3.89	3.72	3.54	3.36	3.57

==== By counties ====
2018 data
County	TFR
Albania	1.37
Berat	1.42
Dibër	2.14
Durrës	1.44
Elbasan	1.60
Fier	1.31
Gjirokastër	1.30
Korçë	1.10
Kukës	2.10
Lezhë	1.63
Shkodër	1.32
Tiranë	1.29
Vlorë	1.00

== Vital statistics ==
=== Before WWII ===
	Average population	Total numbers			Rates per 1000			Total fertility rate
	Average population	Live births	Deaths	Natural change	Crude birth rate	Crude death rate	Natural change	Total fertility rate
1934		33,884	14,440	19,444	34.7	16.7	18.0	3.78
1935	1,005,000	32,640	13,373	19,267	33.1	17.0	16.1	3.98
1936	1,014,000	34,199	16,788	17,411	33.7	16.6	17.1	4.19
1937	1,030,000	34,829	20,036	14,793	33.8	19.5	14.3	4.40
1938	1,040,000	36,138	18,512	17,626	34.3	17.7	16.6	4.61
1939	1,070,000	29,597	16,013	13,584	27.9	15.0	12.9	3.75
1940	1,088,000	33,651	17,812	15,839	31.3	16.4	14.9	4.21
1941	1,100,000	30,627	18,234	12,393	28.0	16.6	11.4	3.77
1942	1,117,000	36,683	15,899	20,784	32.8	14.2	18.6	4.43

=== After WWII ===
Source: Institute of Statistics (INSTAT)

	Average population	Live births	Deaths	Natural change	Crude birth rate (per 1000)	Crude death rate (per 1000)	Natural change (per 1000)	Total fertility rate	Female fertile population (15–49 years)
1950	1,219,000	47,291	17,215	30,076	38.9	14.2	24.7	6.07	259,472
1951	1,242,000	47,813	18,862	28,951	38.5	15.2	23.3	6.01	266,954
1952	1,270,000	44,727	19,826	24,901	35.2	15.6	19.6	5.47	274,437
1953	1,302,000	53,273	17,822	35,451	40.9	13.7	27.2	6.34	281,919
1954	1,340,000	54,635	17,560	37,075	40.8	13.1	27.7	6.33	289,402
1955	1,379,000	61,300	20,750	40,550	44.5	15.0	29.4	6.93	296,885
1956	1,421,000	59,565	16,370	43,195	41.9	11.5	30.4	6.46	304,367
1957	1,462,000	57,241	17,241	40,000	39.2	11.8	27.4	6.06	311,850
1958	1,507,000	63,007	14,059	48,948	41.8	9.3	32.5	6.51	319,332
1959	1,556,000	65,213	15,305	49,908	41.9	9.8	32.1	6.59	326,815
1960	1,608,000	69,686	16,775	52,911	43.3	10.4	32.9	6.85	334,297
1961	1,659,000	68,452	15,445	53,007	41.2	9.3	31.9	6.57	344,907
1962	1,711,319	67,209	18,363	48,846	39.3	10.7	28.5	6.27	355,516
1963	1,762,621	68,967	17,646	51,321	39.1	10.0	29.1	6.26	366,125
1964	1,814,135	68,599	15,811	52,788	37.8	8.7	29.1	6.06	376,734
1965	1,864,791	65,692	16,731	48,961	35.2	9.0	26.3	5.65	387,343
1966	1,914,573	65,127	16,469	48,658	34.0	8.6	25.4	5.32	397,952
1967	1,965,598	69,261	16,565	52,696	35.2	8.4	26.8	5.53	408,561
1968	2,022,272	71,869	16,214	55,655	35.5	8.0	27.5	5.60	419,170
1969	2,081,695	73,458	15,624	57,834	35.3	7.5	27.8	5.60	429,779
1970	2,135,479	69,507	19,774	49,733	32.5	9.3	23.3	5.16	440,388
1971	2,187,853	72,784	17,768	55,016	33.3	8.1	25.1	5.20	459,327
1972	2,243,126	73,607	17,616	55,991	32.8	7.9	25.0	5.06	478,267
1973	2,296,752	69,754	18,032	51,722	30.4	7.9	22.5	4.62	497,206
1974	2,350,124	71,862	17,726	54,136	30.6	7.5	23.0	4.59	516,145
1975	2,404,831	70,688	17,399	53,289	29.4	7.2	22.2	4.23	535,084
1976	2,458,526	70,510	17,029	53,481	28.7	6.9	21.8	4.08	554,024
1977	2,513,546	73,439	16,638	56,801	29.2	6.6	22.6	4.12	572,963
1978	2,566,266	70,594	16,219	54,375	27.5	6.3	21.2	3.84	591,902
1979	2,617,832	72,055	17,421	54,634	27.5	6.7	20.9	3.80	610,841
1980	2,671,997	70,680	16,981	53,699	26.5	6.4	20.1	3.62	629,780
1981	2,726,056	72,180	18,001	54,179	26.5	6.6	19.9	3.63	642,352
1982	2,784,278	77,232	16,521	60,711	27.7	5.9	21.8	3.80	655,703
1983	2,843,960	73,762	17,416	56,346	25.9	6.1	19.8	3.24	692,188
1984	2,904,429	79,177	16,618	62,559	27.3	5.7	21.5	3.41	706,499
1985	2,964,762	77,535	17,179	60,356	26.2	5.8	20.4	3.26	721,315
1986	3,022,635	76,435	17,369	59,066	25.3	5.7	19.5	3.11	735,739
1987	3,083,605	79,696	17,119	62,577	25.8	5.6	20.3	3.16	751,181
1988	3,142,336	80,241	17,027	63,214	25.5	5.4	20.1	3.03	774,599
1989	3,211,964	78,852	18,168	60,684	24.5	5.7	18.9	2.96	770,154
1990	3,266,790	82,125	18,193	63,932	25.1	5.6	19.6	3.03	800,572
1991	3,247,039	77,361	17,743	59,618	23.8	5.5	18.4	2.90	799,394
1992	3,227,287	75,425	18,026	57,399	23.4	5.6	17.8	2.86	798,216
1993	3,207,536	67,730	17,920	49,810	21.1	5.6	15.5	2.61	797,041
1994	3,187,784	72,179	18,342	53,837	22.6	5.8	16.9	2.82	795,863
1995	3,168,033	72,081	18,060	54,021	22.8	5.7	17.1	2.87	794,685
1996	3,148,281	68,358	17,600	50,758	21.7	5.6	16.1	2.77	793,510
1997	3,128,530	61,739	18,237	43,502	19.7	5.8	13.9	2.55	792,333
1998	3,108,778	60,139	18,250	41,889	19.3	5.9	13.5	2.53	791,156
1999	3,089,027	57,948	16,720	41,228	18.8	5.4	13.3	2.49	789,977
2000	3,060,173	51,242	16,421	34,821	16.7	5.4	11.4	2.25	788,801
2001	3,060,178	53,205	19,013	34,192	17.4	6.2	11.2	2.31	790,295
2002	3,051,013	42,527	19,187	23,340	13.9	6.3	7.6	1.90	788,952
2003	3,039,622	45,313	21,294	24,019	14.9	7.0	7.9	2.06	787,972
2004	3,026,941	40,989	20,269	20,720	13.5	6.7	6.8	1.86	785,321
2005	3,011,490	38,898	20,430	18,468	12.9	6.8	6.1	1.79	781,678
2006	2,992,550	35,891	20,852	15,039	12.0	7.0	5.0	1.67	777,045
2007	2,970,020	34,448	20,886	13,562	11.6	7.0	4.6	1.62	771,134
2008	2,947,319	33,445	20,749	12,696	11.3	7.0	4.3	1.58	762,943
2009	2,927,522	34,114	20,428	13,686	11.7	7.0	4.7	1.63	753,608
2010	2,913,028	34,061	20,107	13,954	11.7	6.9	4.8	1.63	744,637
2011	2,905,195	34,285	20,012	14,273	11.8	6.9	4.9	1.65	736,059
2012	2,883,314	35,473	20,870	14,603	12.3	7.2	5.1	1.72	720,641
2013	2,843,261	35,750	20,442	15,308	12.6	7.2	5.4	1.79	696,774
2014	2,801,531	35,760	20,656	15,104	12.8	7.4	5.4	1.85	672,865
2015	2,751,776	32,715	22,418	10,297	11.9	8.1	3.7	1.76	648,781
2016	2,702,125	31,733	21,388	10,345	11.7	7.9	3.8	1.78	625,485
2017	2,662,519	30,869	22,232	8,637	11.6	8.3	3.2	1.78	607,709
2018	2,624,416	28,934	21,804	7,130	11.0	8.3	2.7	1.70	592,453
2019	2,580,580	28,561	21,937	6,624	11.1	8.5	2.6	1.74	574,304
2020	2,544,463	28,075	27,605	470	11.0	10.8	0.2	1.75	559,350
2021	2,505,870	27,211	30,507	-3,296	10.9	12.2	-1.3	1.74	545,849
2022	2,455,848	24,688	23,998	690	10.1	9.8	0.3	1.63	528,931
2023	2,411,658	23,617	21,286	2,331	9.8	8.8	1.0	1.61	513,378
2024	2,377,128	23,310	22,102	1,208	9.8	9.3	0.5	1.64	499,148
2025	2,349,622	22,541	21,394	1,147	9.6	9.1	0.5		485,862

=== Current vital statistics ===
Period	Live births	Deaths	Natural increase
January–September 2025	16,052	15,540	+512
January–September 2026	16,016	15,424	+592
Difference	–36 (–0.2%)	▼ –116 (–0.7%)	▲ +90

=== Structure of the population ===
Population Estimates by Sex and Age Group (01.I.2021):

Age Group	Male	Female	Total	%
Total	1 409 982	1 419 759	2 829 741	100
0–4	73 974	69 572	143 546	5.07
5–9	81 708	80 005	161 713	5.71
10–14	83 041	79 066	162 107	5.73
15–19	96 566	92 509	189 075	6.68
20–24	109 136	109 651	218 787	7.73
25–29	117 857	117 340	235 197	8.31
30–34	108 995	99 057	208 052	7.35
35–39	91 048	85 911	176 959	6.25
40–44	78 999	80 415	159 414	5.63
45–49	81 594	87 253	168 847	5.97
50–54	90 329	97 106	187 435	6.62
55–59	97 462	101 163	198 625	7.02
60–64	92 124	96 329	188 453	6.66
65–69	72 196	77 028	149 224	5.27
70–74	54 148	58 382	112 530	3.98
75–79	40 995	44 359	85 354	3.02
80–84	27 176	30 982	58 158	2.06
85+	12 634	13 631	26 265	0.93
Age group	Male	Female	Total	Percent
0–14	238 723	228 643	467 366	16.52
15–64	964 110	966 734	1 930 844	68.23
65+	207 149	224 382	431 531	15.25

== Marriages and divorces ==
	Average population	Marriages	Divorces	Crude marriage rate (per 1000)	Crude divorce rate (per 1000)	Divorces per 1000 marriages
1950	1,215,200	12,341	1,188	10.2	1.0	96.3
1951	1,242,000	12,364	1,154	10.0	0.9	93.3
1952	1,270,000	12,387	1,120	9.8	0.9	90.4
1953	1,302,000	12,410	1,087	9.5	0.8	87.6
1954	1,340,000	12,433	1,053	9.3	0.8	84.7
1955	1,379,000	12,456	1,019	9.0	0.7	81.8
1956	1,421,000	12,479	985	8.8	0.7	78.9
1957	1,462,000	12,502	951	8.6	0.7	76.1
1958	1,507,000	12,525	918	8.3	0.6	73.3
1959	1,556,000	12,548	884	8.1	0.6	70.4
1960	1,608,800	12,571	850	7.8	0.5	67.6
1961	1,659,800	18,723	1,314	11.3	0.8	70.2
1962	1,711,319	12,838	1,236	7.5	0.7	96.3
1963	1,762,621	13,182	1,046	7.5	0.6	79.4
1964	1,814,135	13,021	1,104	7.2	0.6	84.8
1965	1,864,791	13,921	1,028	7.5	0.6	73.8
1966	1,914,573	12,968	1,217	6.8	0.6	93.8
1967	1,965,598	16,853	1,415	8.6	0.7	84.0
1968	2,022,272	15,845	1,773	7.8	0.9	111.9
1969	2,081,695	15,322	1,608	7.4	0.8	104.9
1970	2,135,479	14,449	1,625	6.8	0.8	112.5
1971	2,187,853	15,300	1,758	7.0	0.8	114.9
1972	2,243,126	16,159	1,718	7.2	0.8	106.3
1973	2,296,752	18,481	1,791	8.0	0.8	96.9
1974	2,350,124	18,605	1,934	7.9	0.8	104.0
1975	2,404,831	18,729	1,853	7.8	0.8	98.9
1976	2,458,526	18,600	1,900	7.6	0.8	102.2
1977	2,513,546	19,934	2,003	7.9	0.8	100.5
1978	2,566,266	20,464	1,836	8.0	0.7	89.7
1979	2,617,832	21,355	1,849	8.2	0.7	86.6
1980	2,671,997	21,729	2,024	8.1	0.8	93.1
1981	2,726,056	23,301	2,222	8.5	0.8	95.4
1982	2,784,278	25,157	2,206	9.0	0.8	87.7
1983	2,843,960	25,607	2,371	9.0	0.8	92.6
1984	2,904,429	26,397	2,335	9.1	0.8	88.5
1985	2,964,762	25,271	2,451	8.5	0.8	97.0
1986	3,022,635	25,718	2,383	8.5	0.8	92.7
1987	3,083,605	27,370	2,537	8.9	0.8	92.7
1988	3,142,336	28,174	2,597	9.0	0.8	92.2
1989	3,211,964	27,655	2,628	8.6	0.8	95.0
1990	3,266,790	28,992	2,675	8.9	0.8	92.3
1991	3,247,039	24,853	2,236	7.7	0.7	90.0
1992	3,227,287	26,405	2,480	8.2	0.8	93.9
1993	3,207,536	25,963	2,251	8.1	0.7	86.7
1994	3,187,784	27,895	2,108	8.8	0.7	75.6
1995	3,168,033	26,989	2,331	8.5	0.7	86.4
1996	3,148,281	27,690	1,901	8.8	0.6	68.7
1997	3,128,530	24,122	1,430	7.7	0.5	59.3
1998	3,108,778	27,871	2,005	9.0	0.6	71.9
1999	3,089,027	27,254	2,114	8.8	0.7	77.6
2000	3,060,173	25,820	2,168	8.4	0.7	84.0
2001	3,060,169	25,717	2,462	8.4	0.8	95.7
2002	3,051,010	26,202	3,494	8.6	1.1	133.3
2003	3,039,616	27,342	3,634	9.0	1.2	132.9
2004	3,026,939	20,949	2,968	6.9	1.0	141.7
2005	3,011,487	21,795	3,929	7.2	1.3	180.3
2006	2,992,547	21,332	4,075	7.1	1.4	191.0
2007	2,970,017	22,371	3,305	7.5	1.1	147.7
2008	2,947,314	21,290	3,610	7.2	1.2	169.6
2009	2,927,519	26,174	3,606	8.9	1.2	137.8
2010	2,913,021	25,428	3,478	8.7	1.2	136.8
2011	2,905,195	25,556	3,642	8.8	1.3	142.5
2012	2,900,401	22,891	3,561	7.9	1.2	155.6
2013	2,895,092	23,820	3,747	8.2	1.3	157.3
2014	2,889,104	23,769	4,240	8.2	1.5	178.4
2015	2,880,703	24,997	3,761	8.7	1.3	150.5
2016	2,876,101	22,562	4,345	7.8	1.5	192.6
2017	2,873,457	22,641	4,508	7.9	1.6	199.1
2018	2,866,376	23,104	4,846	8.1	1.7	209.7
2019	2,854,191	22,415		7.9		
2020	2,837,849	17,473		6.2		

== Migration ==
Net migration data for Albania (2011–2022)
Year	Immigration	Emigration	Net migration
2011	36,397	55,162	-18,765
2012	32,534	52,307	-19,773
2013	28,624	49,425	-20,801
2014	24,740	46,525	-21,785
2015	20,843	41,443	-20,600
2016	23,060	32,533	-9,473
2017	25,003	39,905	-14,902
2018	23,673	38,703	-15,030
2019	20,753	43,835	-23,082
2020	7,170	23,854	-16,684
2021	9,195	42,048	-32,853
2022	13,963	46,460	-32,497

== Ethnic groups ==
Albania is inhabited mostly by Albanians. In the 2011 official census, 97.8% of those who disclosed their identity were Albanians (82.58% overall), while 2.3% stated other ethnicities (1.9% overall). Albania recognizes nine national minorities. These include Aromanians, Balkan Egyptians, Greeks, Bulgarians, Bosniaks, Macedonians, Montenegrins, Serbs, and Roma. As conducting a satisfactory census of ethnic minorities is one of the country's commitments to the European Union, the Government of Albania conducted an official census to clarify the ethnic composition of the population in 2011. However this census was deemed unreliable by internal and external organisations, including the Council of Europe and many of Albania's ethnic minority groups. The last census to include data on ethnic minorities was conducted in 1989. The census conducted in 2001 did not collect information about ethnic groups and nationalities in the population.

Since the 21st century, Albania has also witnessed a significant settlement of foreign expats into the country, such as Italians, Chinese, Filipinos, Turks, Bengalis, Americans, Portuguese and other foreign workers. In 2021 there were as many as 15,000 foreigners living in Albania (0.5% of the population).

Albania also houses 3,200 Afghan refugees and over 3,800 Ukrainian refugees.

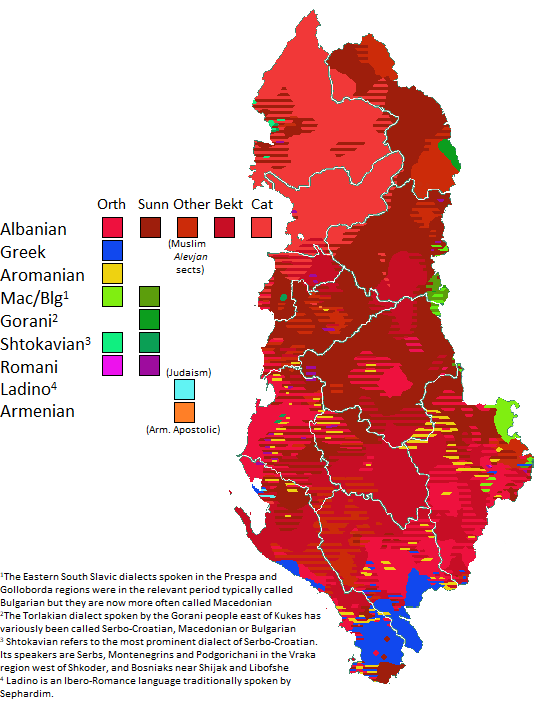
Traditional locations of linguistic and religious communities in Albania

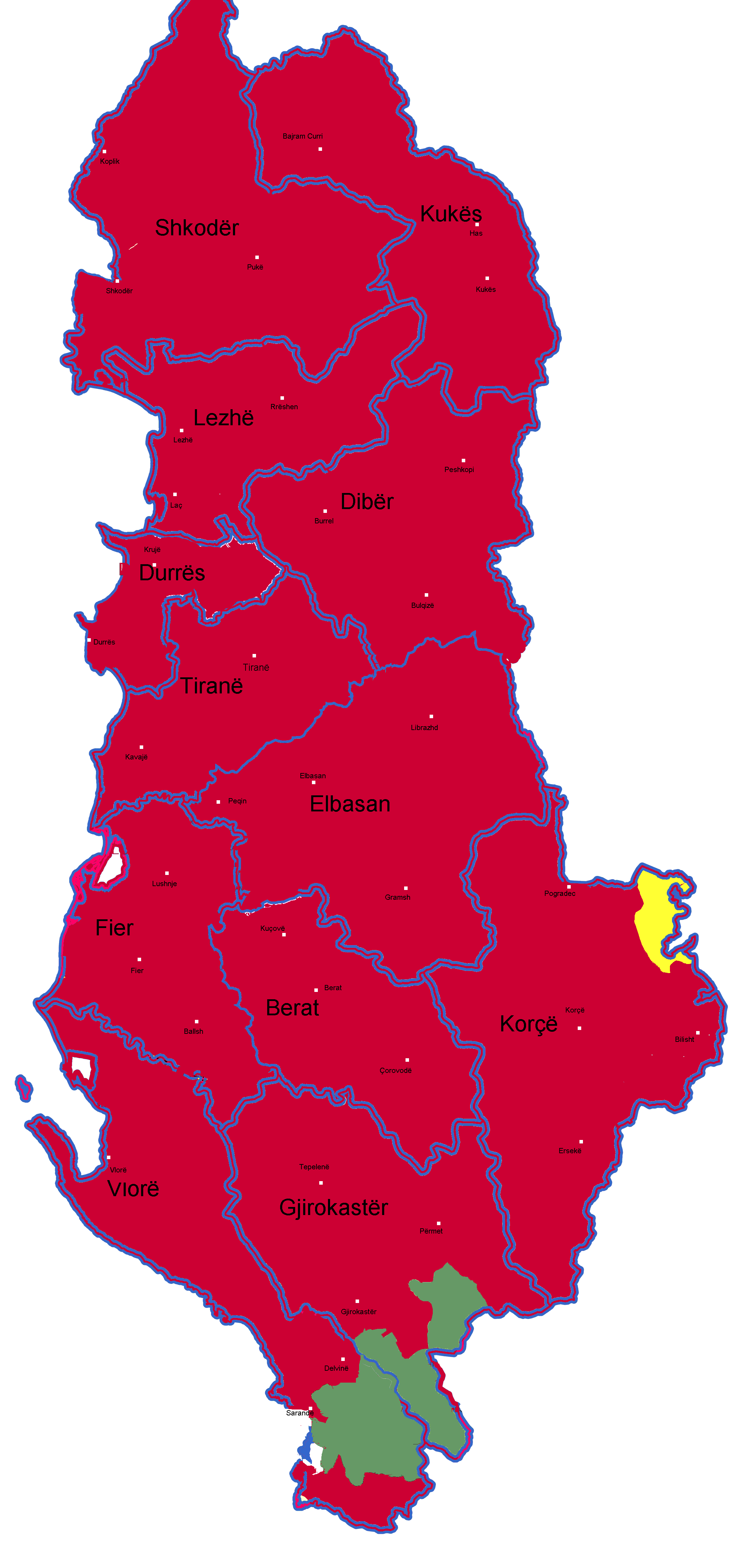
Ethnic composition per the 1989 census:
Red – Albanian majority
Green – Greek majority
Yellow – Macedonian majority

Population of Albania according to ethnic group 1945–2023
Ethnic group	Census 1945		Census 1950		Census 1955		Census 1960		Census 1979		Census 1989		Census 2011^{1}		Census 2023	
Ethnic group	Number	%	Number	%	Number	%	Number	%	Number	%	Number	%	Number	%	Number	%
Albanians	1,075,500	95.9	1,186,100	97.3	1,349,100	97.0	1,581,745	97.3	2,535,913	97.9	3,117,601	98.0	2,312,356	82.58	2,186,917	91.04%
Greeks	26,535	2.4	29,000	2.4	35,345	2.5	40,000	2.5	49,307	1.9	58,758	1.8	24,243	0.87	23,485	0.98
Balkan Egyptians	–	–	–	–	–	–	–	–	–	–	–	–	3,368	0.12	12,375	0.52
Romani	–	–	–	–	–	–	–	–	–	–	–	–	8,301	0.30	9,813	0.41
Bulgarians^{2}	–	–	–	–	–	–	–	–	–	–	–	–	–	–	7,057	0.29
Bosniaks	–	–	–	–	–	–	–	–	–	–	–	–	–	–	2,963	0.12
Aromanians	–	–	–	–	–	–	–	–	–	–	782	–	8,266	0.30	2,459	0.10
Macedonians	14,400	1.3	2,273	0.2	3,341	0.2	4,235	0.3	4,097	0.2	4,697	0.15	5,512	0.20	2,281	0.09
Serbs–Montenegrins	–	–	1,570	0.1	3,713	0.3	300	0.0	1,283	0.0	100	0.00	366	0.01	1,095^{3}	0.05
Other	–	–	–	–	–	–	–	–	5,600	0.5	1,261	0.04	2,644	0.11	5,710^{4}	0.24^{4}
Did not declare ethnicity	–	–	–	–	–	–	–	–	–	–	–	–	435,082	15.6	13,507	0.56
Data not available	–	–	–	–	–	–	–	–	–	–	–	–	–	–	134,451	5.60

Notes

^{1} At the 2011 census a total of 390,938 (14% of the total population) did not declare their nationality, while another 44,144 (1.6%) considered the nationality as 'not relevant'. The census is regarded unreliable and inaccurate by the Council of Europe. Vlachs (Aromanians) live in the south of the country, whereas Montenegrins and Serbs live in the north. Macedonians mostly live in Mala Prespa and the regions along the Macedonian border, known as 'Golo Brdo' and 'Gora'.
^{2} The Bulgarian minority was only recognised in 2017, after decades-long blockade by former Yugoslavia and following a 2016 recommendation by the European Parliament that the rights of people of Bulgarian ethnicity in the Prespa, Gollobordë, and Gora regions should be respected.
^{3} Includes 584 Serbs and 511 Montenegrins.
^{4} Includes 3,798 people declaring "Other ethnic identity", 770 people declaring "Mixed ethnic identity" and 1,142 people declaring "No ethnic identity".

== Religion ==
Population of Albania according to religious group 1923–2023
Religion group	Census 1923		Census 1927		Census 1942		Census 2011		Census 2023	
Religion group	Number	%	Number	%	Number	%	Number	%	Number	%
Sunni Muslim	558,000	68.5	563,729	67.6	599,912	54.2	1,587,608	56.7	1,101,718	45.86
Bektashi Muslim	558,000	68.5	563,729	67.6	163,811	14.7	58,628	2.09	115,644	4.81
Muslim	558,000	68.5	563,729	67.6	763,723	68.9	1,646,236	58.79	1,217,362	50.67
Catholic	85,000	10.5	88,739	10.6	113,891	10.3	280,921	10.0	201,530	8.38
Eastern Orthodox	171,000	20.5	181,051	21.7	229,080	20.7	188,992	6.75	173,645	7.22
Evangelical							5,616	0.2	9,658	0.4
Christian	256,000	31	269,790	32.3	342,971	31	475,529	16.77	384,833	16.00
Atheists							69,995	2.5	85,311	3.55
Believers without denomination							153,630	5.49	332,155	13.82
Non-religious							223,625	8.0	417,466	17.37
Not stated / other			99	0.01	156	0.01	454,046	16.2	382,452	15.91
TOTAL	814,000	100	833,613	100	1,106,850	100	2,800,138	100	2,402,113	100

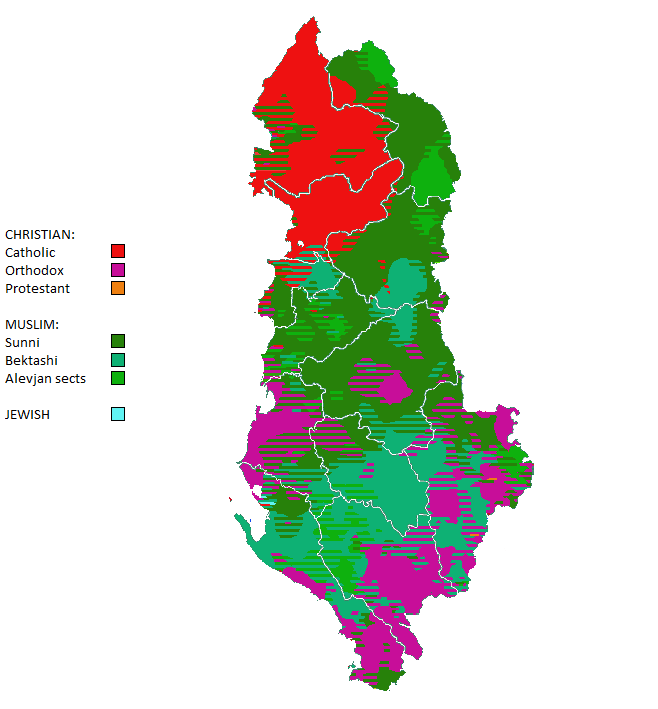
Map depicting the approximate traditional distribution of religions in Albania (c. 1900)

According to the 2023 census, there were 1,101,718 (45.86%) Muslims (mostly Sunni Muslims and Non-denominational Muslims) 201,530 (8.38%) Catholics, 173,645 (7.22%) Eastern Orthodox, 115,644 (4.81%) Bektashi Muslims, 9,658 (0.4%) Evangelicals, 3 670 (0.15%) of other religions, 332,155 (13.82%) believers without denomination, 85,311 (3.55%) Atheists and 378,782 (15.76%) did not provide an answer.

The Constitution of Albania extends freedom of religion to all citizens and the government generally respects this right in practice. It declares no official religion and provides for equality of all religions. However, the predominant religious communities enjoy a greater degree of official recognition and social status based on their historical presence in the country. All registered religious groups have the right to hold bank accounts and to own property and buildings. Religious freedoms have in large part been secured by the generally amicable relationship among religions. The Ministry of Education has the right to approve the curricula of religious schools to ensure their compliance with national education standards while the State Committee on Cults oversees implementation. There are also 68 vocational training centers administered by religious communities.

Government policy and practice contributed to the generally free exercise of religion. The government is secular and the Ministry of Education asserts that public schools in the country are secular and that the law prohibits ideological and religious indoctrination. Religion is not taught in public schools.

== Language ==
Map illustrating the various dialects of the Albanian language in Southern Europe

The Albanian language is the official language of Albania. It has two distinct dialects, Tosk, spoken in the south, and Gheg, spoken in the north. The Shkumbin river is the rough dividing line between the two dialects. The language is spoken primarily in Greece, Italy, Kosovo, North Macedonia and Montenegro. Centuries-old communities speaking Albanian-based dialects can be found scattered in Greece (Arvanites), Southern Italy, Sicily and Calabria (Arbëreshë) and in Ukraine. However, due to the large Albanian diaspora, the total number of speakers is much higher than the native speakers in Southern Europe. The four dialects include Tosk Albanian, Gheg Albanian, Arbëresh and Arvanitika.

Foreign languages spoken generally include one – or more – amongst the following: English, French, Greek, Italian. Language knowledge is increasing due to returning migrants, as well as new Greek and Italian communities in the country. In particular, Italian is widely spoken throughout Albania. La Francophonie states that 30,000 French speakers can be found in Albania. Greek, the language of the Greek minority of the south, is also very widespread in that region. Nowadays, knowledge of English is growing very rapidly, especially among the youth.

The ethnic minorities languages include Aromanian, Serbian, Macedonian, Bosnian, Bulgarian, Gorani, and Roma. Greek is the largest minority language of the country as well as the first largest foreign language. Approximately 5,000 Macedonian language-speakers can be found in Albania. Most of these living in the southeastern part of the country.

== Education ==
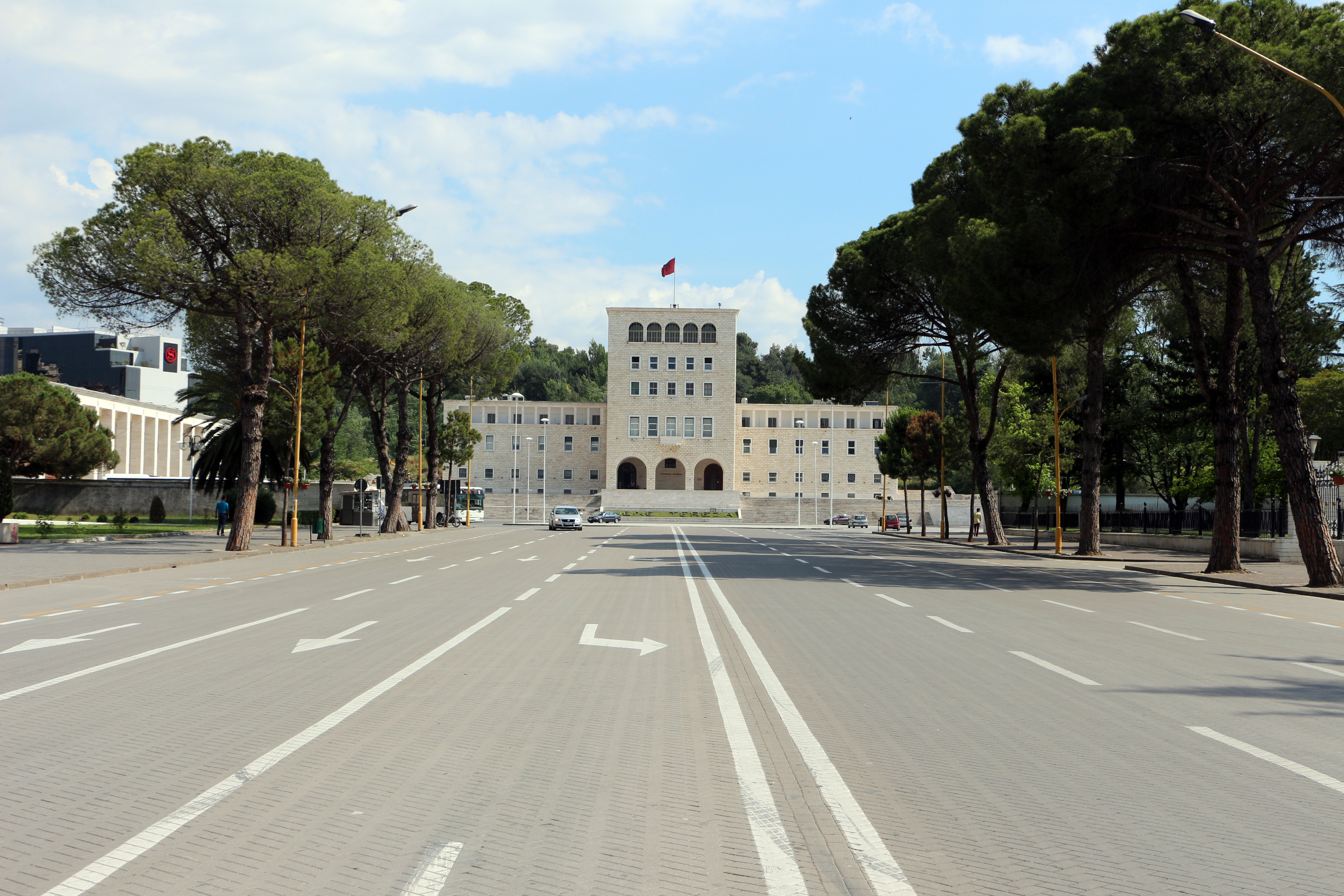
The University of Tirana is the largest and highest ranking university in Albania.

Literacy in the country is 98.7 percent. The school life expectancy (primary to tertiary education) of Albania is 16 years. The nation ranks 25th out of 167 countries in the world. In 2015, the overall literacy rate in Albania was 98.7%; the male literacy rate was 99.2% and female literacy rate was 98.3%.

Education for primary (arsimi fillor), secondary (arsimi i mesëm), and tertiary (arsimi universitar) levels are mostly supported by the state. Classes start in September and end in June. Albanian is the primary language of instruction in all public schools. Education takes place in three stages: primary, secondary, and pre-university. Primary education is obligatory from grade 1 to 9. Students must pass the graduation exams at the end of the 9th grade in order to continue their education. After primary school, the general education is provided at the secondary schools. Students get prepared for the Matura examination, allowing them to obtain their matura diploma, which grants admission to higher education. The country follows the Bologna model in accordance with the 2007 Law on 'Higher Education'. These institutions can be public or private, and may offer one, two or three levels of higher education depending on the institution.

== Health ==
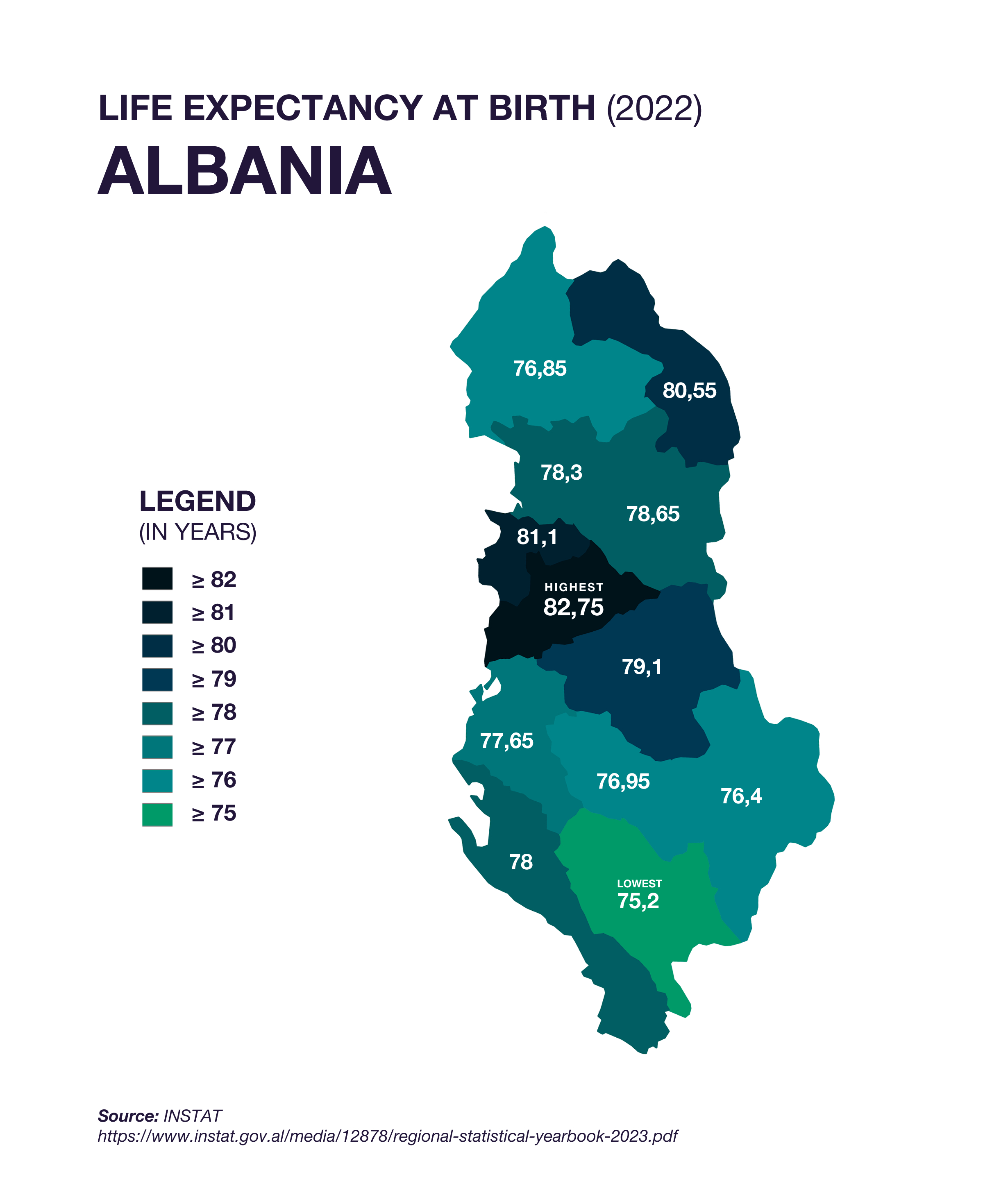
Life expectancy in Albania

Life expectancy at birth in Albania was 80.6 years in 2024, outperforming a number of European Union countries, such as Estonia, Poland and the Czech Republic. Tirana, Albania's capital and most populous city, had a life expectancy at birth of 82.8 years in 2022, remarkably high for the region, outperforming significantly wealthier capital cities in Western Europe, such as Vienna and Berlin.

Albania has a universal health care system. In 2000, Albania had the world's 55th best healthcare performance.

According to the World Health Organization (WHO), Albania ranks around the 40th in the world in terms of life expectancy. Compared to other Western countries, Albania has a low rate of obesity.

Period	Life expectancy in years	Period	Life expectancy in years
1938	38.0	1980–1985	70.7
1950–1955	55.3	1985–1990	71.9
1955–1960	59.3	1990–1995	71.7
1960–1965	64.9	1995–2000	73.0
1965–1970	66.2	2000–2005	74.8
1970–1975	67.7	2005–2010	75.7
1975–1980	69.7	2010–2015	77.7

Source: UN World Population Prospects

== Diaspora ==
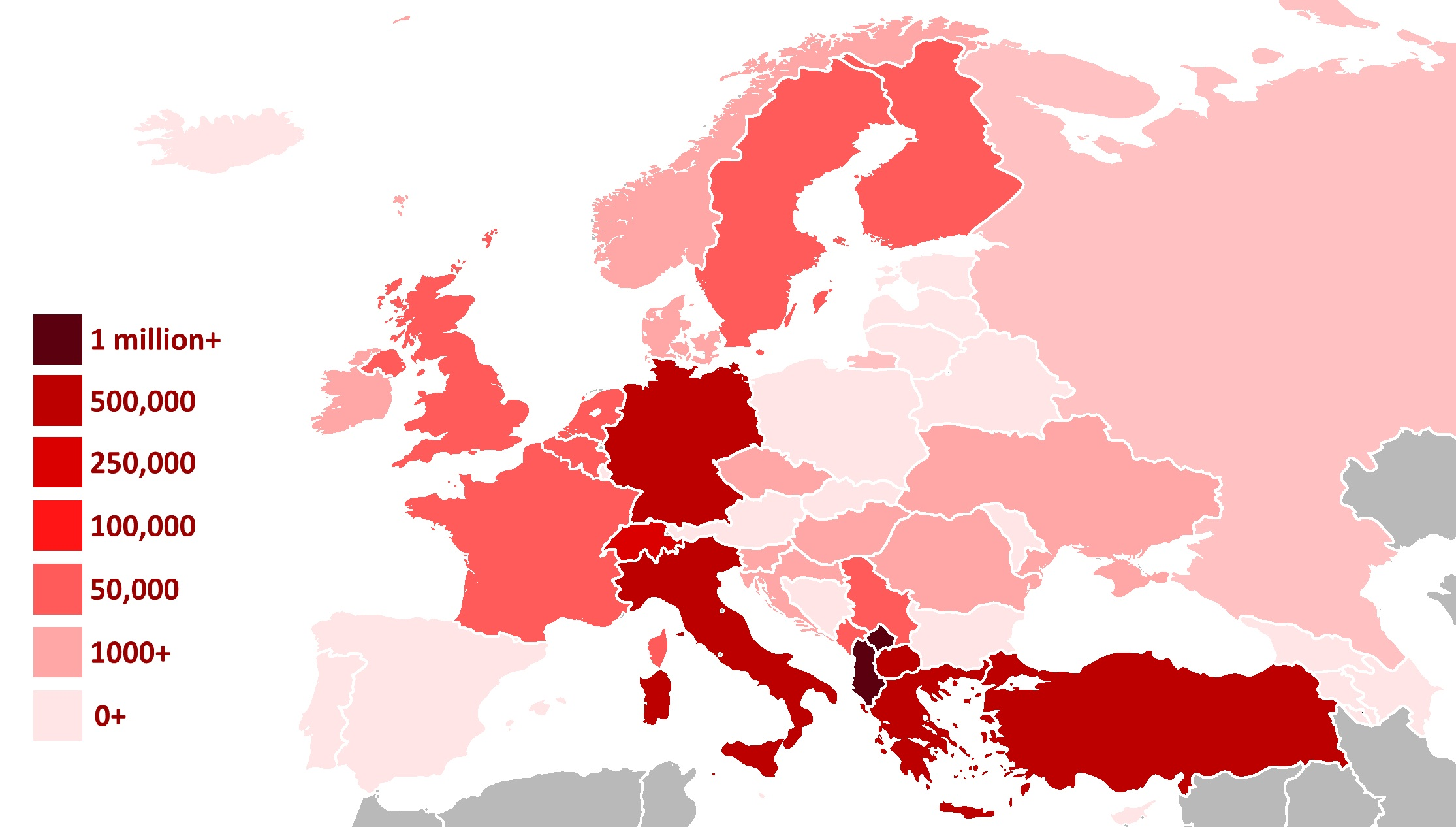
Distribution of Albanians in Europe

Albanians have established communities in many regions throughout southern Europe. The modern Albanian diaspora was formed largely in the 15th century, when many Albanians emigrated to southern Italy, especially in Sicily and Calabria also to Greece, to escape either various socio-political difficulties and the Ottoman conquest. Other destinations include the US, Canada, Argentina, and Turkey.

Over the last twenty years, Albania has experienced major demographic changes, having the highest population growth in Europe before the collapse of communism in the country. Albania has also shifted to population decline since the changes. However, during the final days of the transition from communism to capitalism in 1990, over a million Albanians moved to foreign countries. These include Australia, Canada, France, Germany, Italy, the Nordic countries, Switzerland and the United Kingdom. About 440,000 of them settled in Greece, where Albanians make up 60% of immigrants. 350,000 Albanians have migrated to Italy over the 1990s to 2000s, however the number has increased substantially. The situation in Kosovo is similar. More than a million Albanians have left Kosovo permanently since the late 1980s, not counting those fleeing the Kosovo War who have subsequently returned. Important destinations for Albanians emigrating from Kosovo have been Switzerland and Germany.

== See also ==
- Albania
- Albanian diaspora
- Demographics of Kosovo
