= Sociedad Cultural Femenina =

Women's organization in Honduras

Sociedad Cultural Femenina (Society of Feminine Culture), was a women's organization in Honduras, founded in 1927.

It was the first women's rights organization in Honduras, and played an important role in the campaign for women's suffrage in Honduras.

The Sociedad Cultural Femenina was founded in 1927 by Visitación Padilla, and became a pioneering and leading force in the women's rights movement in Honduras. The first priority during the dictatorship of Tiburcio Caria in 1932-1949 was to work for the fall of the regime and the introduction of democracy, since political repression was seen as the enemy of women's rights. In the 1940s, the campaign of women's suffrage was however explicitly included in the struggle of democracy, and a campaign of the issue was launched.

In 1949, the dictatorship was replaced by a democracy; women's suffrage was finally approved by decree in November 1955, and was formally introduced in the 1957 Constitution.
