= Women's Cultural Society =

Honduran women's organization

The Women's Cultural Society (Sociedad Cultural Feminina) was a women's organization in Honduras. It was founded in the 1920s, opposing the regime of Tiburcio Carias Andino and demanding women's economic and political rights. Visitación Padilla and Graciela Amaya de García have each been credited with founding the organization.

== History ==
The Women's Cultural Society was founded in 1923 or 1924. Founded in Tegucigalpa, the society had close links to the Honduran Union Association. Padilla was the first president, and later followed by Graciela García. The society established free evening classes for adult women, teaching social sciences, mathematics, Spanish, civics and handicrafts. It also hosted cultural and political seminars on cultural and political topics . The society also published a newsletter, Women's Culture.
