= Ungrej =

- Administrative unit
- Location within Albania
- Coordinates: 41°52′N 19°47′E
- Country: Albania
- County: Lezhë
- Municipality: Lezhë

Population (2023)
  - Administrative unit: 465
- Time zone: UTC+1 (CET)
  - Summer (DST): UTC+2 (CEST)

Ungrej is a village and a former municipality in the Lezhë County, northwestern Albania. At the 2015 local government reform it became a subdivision of the municipality Lezhë.

== Demographics ==
At the 2015 local government reform, Ungrej became a subdivision of the municipality Lezhë. As of the 2023 Albanian census, Ungrej had a population of 465 residents, spread across an area of 118.0 square kilometers, resulting in a low population density of approximately 3.9 inhabitants per square kilometer. The population has declined significantly in recent years, with a reported decrease of 9.8% since 2011. The gender distribution was slightly skewed, with males comprising 54.2% (252 individuals) and females 45.8% (213 individuals) of the population.

The age structure in 2023 showed that the majority of residents (69.7%) were between 15 and 64 years old, reflecting the working-age population. Children aged 0–14 made up 9.5% of the population, while 20.9% were aged 65 and over, indicating an aging demographic trend in the village.

== History ==
Ungrej holds a notable place in the historical and cultural landscape of northern Albania. Originally part of the broader mountainous region known as Kashnjet, Ungrej rose to administrative prominence after the Congress of Lushnjë in 1920 when it was designated the center of the Mirdita sub-prefecture. This change brought increased infrastructure, including the extension of a telephone line along the Shkodër-Orosh road and the establishment of gendarmerie posts in Ungrej, Qafë-Vorrëz, and Shën Pal. The name of the village means "Good Field" and reflects its transformation from a remote highland area into a hub of local governance. In 1970, an administrative reform united the villages of Ungrej, Kashnjet, and Kalivaç into a single local unit that today includes several mountain communities.

The area also has deep historical roots dating back to antiquity. It was once inhabited by the Illyrian tribe of the Pirustae, and evidence of their presence includes Bronze Age burial mounds in Kalor, a bronze helmet found in Fregën, and the remains of early Christian churches. Over the centuries, Ungrej and its surroundings became a stop for travelers, herders, and scholars alike. Notably, the Austro-Hungarian scholar Baron Nopça passed through the region between 1905 and 1910, while many Albanian professionals served in Kashnjet during their early careers. The area's tradition of hospitality remains a hallmark of its identity, with a rich oral history reflecting the unwritten highland code of honor and generosity toward travelers.
