= Minorities of Albania =

Albania recognizes nine ethnic or cultural minorities, which are the Aromanian, Greek, Macedonian, Montenegrin, Serb, Roma, Egyptian, Bosnian and Bulgarian peoples. Additional minorities are the Gorani and Jews.

== Overview ==
Issues of ethnicity are a delicate topic and subject to debate. Contrary to official statistics that show an over 97 per cent Albanian majority in the country, minority groups (such as Greeks, Macedonians, Montenegrins, Roma and Aromanians) have frequently disputed the official numbers, asserting a higher percentage of the country's population. According to the disputed 2011 census, ethnic affiliation was as follows: Albanians 2,312,356 (82.6% of the total), Greeks 24,243 (0.9%), Macedonians 5,512 (0.2%), Montenegrins 366 (0.01%), Aromanians 8,266 (0.30%), Romani 8,301 (0.3%), Balkan Egyptians 3,368 (0.1%), other ethnicities 2,644 (0.1%), no declared ethnicity 390,938 (14.0%), and not relevant 44,144 (1.6%). On the quality of the specific data the Advisory Committee on the Framework Convention for the Protection of National Minorities stated that "the results of the census should be viewed with the utmost caution and calls on the authorities not to rely exclusively on the data on nationality collected during the census in determining its policy on the protection of national minorities.".

Albania recognises nine national or cultural minorities: Aromanian, Greek, Macedonian, Montenegrin, Serb, Roma, Egyptian, Bosniak and Bulgarian peoples. Other Albanian minorities are the Gorani people and Jews. Regarding the Greeks, "it is difficult to know how many Greeks there are in Albania". The estimates vary between 60,000 and 300,000 ethnic Greeks in Albania. According to Ian Jeffries, most of Western sources put the number at around 200,000. The 300,000 mark is supported by Greek government as well. The CIA World Factbook estimates the Greek minority to constitute 0.9% of the total population. The US State Department estimates that Greeks make up 1.17%, and other minorities 0.23%, of the population. The latter questions the validity of the census data about the Greek minority, due to the fact that measurements have been affected by boycott.

Macedonian and some Greek minority groups have sharply criticized Article 20 of the Census law, according to which a $1,000 fine will be imposed on anyone who will declare an ethnicity other than what is stated on his or her birth certificate. This is claimed to be an attempt to intimidate minorities into declaring Albanian ethnicity, according to them the Albanian government has stated that it will jail anyone who does not participate in the census or refuse to declare his or her ethnicity. Genc Pollo, the minister in charge has declared that: "Albanian citizens will be able to freely express their ethnic and religious affiliation and mother tongue. However, they are not forced to answer these sensitive questions". The amendments criticized do not include jailing or forced declaration of ethnicity or religion; only a fine is envisioned which can be overthrown by court.

Greek representatives form part of the Albanian parliament and the government has invited Albanian Greeks to register, as the only way to improve their status. On the other hand, nationalists, various organizations and political parties in Albania have expressed their concern that the census might artificially increase the numbers of the Greek minority, which might be then employed by Greece to challenge Albania's territorial integrity.

== Statistics ==
=== Maps ===
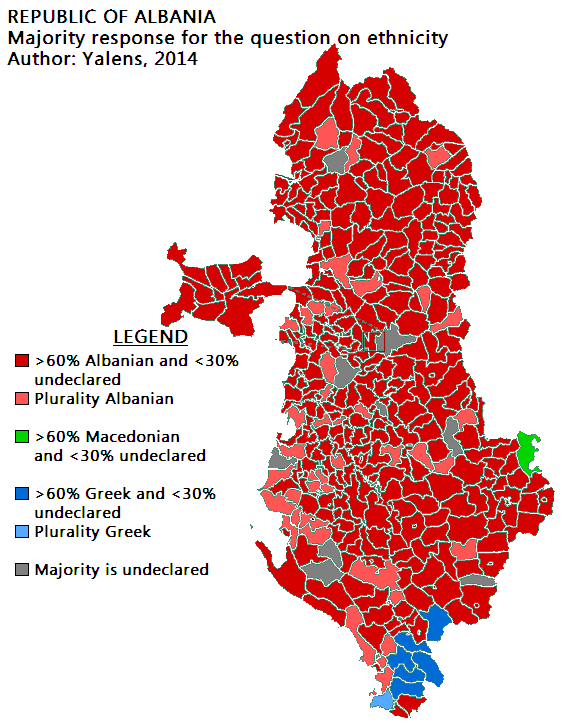
Distribution of ethnic groups within Albania, as of the 2011 census. Districts colored gray are those where a majority of people did not declare an ethnicity (the question was optional). The census was criticized and boycotted by minorities in Albania.

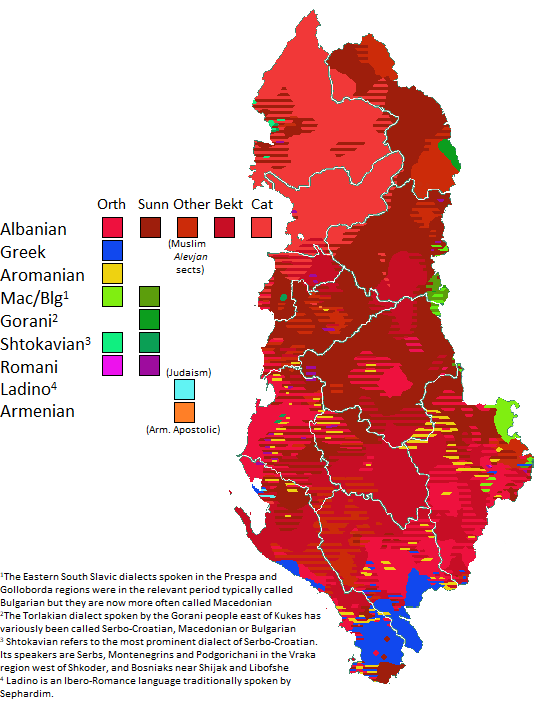
Traditional locations of linguistic and religious communities in Albania.
