= Visitación Padilla =

Honduran educator and feminist activist

Visitación Padilla Irias (*Talanga, Francisco Morazán, July 2, 1882 – February 12, 1960, Comayagüela, DC) was an educator and feminist activist.

Padilla organized the mutual aid societies of Honduras, strengthened anti-alcohol leagues and fervently organized the rights of Honduran women.

== Life ==
Visitación Padilla was born in Talanga, a municipality of the Departamento of Francisco Morazán, in the Republic of Honduras. She graduated and became a teacher in 1909, then in 1913 became a member of the organization named “Ateneo de Honduras” together with writers Rafael Heliodoro Valle y Froilán Turcios, introducing her organizational qualities. In 1917, she founded the liberal newspaper “Juan Rafael Mora” in Tegucigalpa.

During the Civil War of 1924, Padilla expressed her ideas in Boletín de la Defensa Nacional, and at the same time founded "Sociedad Cultural Femenina", a group of women from Tegucigalpa led by Padilla. (Note: Graciela Amaya de García, Antonieta, Jesús, Mariana y Ceferina Elvir, María Luisa Medina, Eva Sofía Dávila, Goya Isabel López, Flora Suazo, Ángela y Genoveva Andino, Natalia Triminio, Rosita Amador, Juana Ochoa, Sofía Vega, María López, Adriana Hernández, Florencia Padilla, Rosa Flores) In 1926 the group received governmental funding from the doctor Miguel Paz Barahona to decree the “day of the mother”.

Padilla retired from teaching in 1929. The following year (1930) she was invited to the commemoration of the foundation of the newspaper La Gaceta. In 1934 she formed the group “Zelaya Sierra” to pay tribute to the Honduran artist and teacher Pablo Zelaya Sierra. During this time it was rumored that the dictator Doctor and general Tiburcio Carias Andino would leave their governmental position and the dictatorship that had reigned since 1936; Padilla expressed her opinions in the newspapers “Orientación” and “Ciudadano.” A year later, Carias retired from his position in government and allowed the election of generals that would be won by Juan Manuel Gálvez.

A formal act was passed on January 25, 1954, when the president of the time, the accountant Julio Lozano Díaz, recognized the rights of women and allowed them to vote for the first time in the Republic of Honduras. Padilla, the tireless activist, was there.

== Other publications ==
In addition to being a columnist for the newspaper “El Nacional”, wrote the children's book Azucenas and the essay Pasatiempos e Historias de la Educación Pública Hondureña.

== Acknowledgements/recognitions ==
- Her images appear in sello postal de Lps 0.02.
- She declared 2010 as "Año de Visitación Padilla"

== Legacy ==
The Movimiento de Mujeres por la Paz (Honduran Women's Committee for Peace "Visitación Padilla") was founded in 1984 and named after Padilla, in order to advocate for gender equality, work against gender violence and support women's participation in public life. Involved from its beginning, the one-time Secretary was the late political activist Gladys Lanza.

== Bibliography ==
Dictionary of Personalities of Honduras/Padilla, Visitación.
