= Graciela Amaya de García =

Central American feminist and labor organizer

- Born: María Graciela Amaya Barrientos; 11 January 1895; San Salvador, El Salvador
- Died: 11 October 1995 (aged 100); Mexico City, Mexico
- Other names: Graciela García
- Occupations: feminist and labor activist
- Years active: 1921–1979
- Known for: founding the first feminist organization in Honduras

Graciela Amaya de García (11 January 1895 – 11 October 1995) was a Central American feminist and labor organizer. Born in El Salvador and trained as a teacher, she moved to Honduras at the age of twenty. Joining the socialist movement, she became a party operative, founding trade unions to resist the labor practices of the industrialists operating in the country. She formed the first feminist organization of Honduras, the Society of Feminist Culture, in 1923 and organized night schools for working women to teach them about their rights. Expelled from Honduras for leading demonstrations against the government in 1944, she fled home to El Salvador but remained only a few months because a coup d'etat brought in a dictatorship. Relocating to Guatemala, García continued with her activities organizing labor and educating working-class people, until she was expelled by the president in 1946. Moving to Mexico, she worked for the Secretariate of Education and wrote articles in support of leftist politics and women.

== Early life ==
María Graciela Amaya Barrientos was born on 11 January 1895 in San Salvador, El Salvador to María Dolores Barrientos and José Bernardino Amaya. Her maternal grandfather was Felipe Barrientos, a lawyer and military general and her cousin Fernando Barrientos was a labor organizer. Her mother died when she was two years old and she was raised by her grandmother along with her only sibling, Felipe Armando. Amaya attended the Escuela Normal de Maestras in San Salvador learning pedagogy and taught in schools in El Salvador. In 1915, she and her father moved to Tegucigalpa, Honduras and the following year, she married Jose García Lardizabel. Her father discouraged her from working and she spent several years taking care of her young son, Tómas. In the early 1920s, her brother, Armando, who had been a socialist labor organizer in the United States joined the family in Honduras and introduced García to the ideas of socialism.

== Career ==
By 1921, García, her brother Armando, Víctor M. Angulo, Manuel Cálix Herrera, and Carlos Gómez were recruited by Juan Pablo Wainwright as Marxist labor organizers. He led them in organizing strikes in Northern Honduras against the banana producing companies and railroads for higher wages and benefits. Under the umbrella organization, Honduran Workers' Federation (Spanish: Federación Obrera Hondureña (FOH)), the various members created member labor unions. García headed the union Redención, which was a member of FOH. In 1923, she founded the Society of Feminist Culture (Spanish: Sociedad Cultura Femenina, which was a socialist women's group aimed at organizing working women. It was the first feminist group created in Honduras and worked in resistance to the government. The group founded night schools for women which gave forums to teach women about their rights and equality. The organization also published a newsletter to discuss topics about women's issues and emancipation.

García continued her organizing activities, distributing pamphlets, but conflicts between the FOH and the Communist Party of Honduras forced the dissolution of the FOH in 1929. In that year, she and her brother participated with Cálix to organize a congress of workers and peasant congress at the port of Tela. Held on 29 May, the congress sparked the creation of the Honduran Trade Union Federation (Spanish: Federación Sindical Hondureña (FSH)) which initially organized dock and railroad workers and later organized the United Fruit Company workers. By 1930, led by Wainright, the FSH were initiating strikes against the Standard Fruit Company and United Fruit. Wainright was singled out as an instigator and was captured and executed in 1932. Later that same year, the FSH brought another strike against Standard Fruit and the Truxillo Railroad Company. They supported Cálix in a bid for the presidency, but when the dictator, Tiburcio Carías Andino won the 1932 election, he outlawed the communist party.

García continued her organization and strike activities, having to operate from clandestine locations until 1944. She led demonstrations in front of the presidential residence in May and June calling for the release of political prisoners. In July of that year, mass protests were held against the government of Carías and García was arrested an imprisoned. She and her brother were expelled and returned to El Salvador. She joined the National Union of Workers (Spanish: Unión Nacional de Trabajadores (UNT)), which was affiliated with the illegal Communist Party of El Salvador and continued her organizing efforts. Joining Women Committee, she participated in the presidential campaign for Arturo Romero, who was one of the candidates to replace the temporary president Andrés Ignacio Menéndez. When the coup d'etat by Osmín Aguirre y Salinas ended the elections in October 1944, García fled to Guatemala.

In Guatemala, García organized the Salvadoran Liberation Committee to support exiles from El Salvador and rebels fighting against Aguirre. Her son, Tómas, though a third-year medical student, joined the resistance and was killed in a battle in December 1944 when a group of militants overtook Ahuachapán in an attempt to overthrow the Aguirre regime. In 1945, she became one of the founders of the Confederation of Workers of Guatemala and organized a school Claridad (Clarity) to train workers, as she had done earlier in Honduras. Opposition to trade unions by conservative factors in the society led to García's expulsion by Guatemalan president Juan José Arévalo in February 1946. She and her husband fled to Mexico City and continued to work for the resistance movement against Carias' dictatorship. She took employment with the Secretariat of Public Education, where she worked from 1946 to 1979. She also remained active in trade unions and leftist political movements, publishing articles in various newspapers, such as El Popular and the bi-monthly journal Pagenias de Ayer y de Hoy.

García published her memoirs, Páginas de lucha revolucionaria en Centroamérica (Pages from the revolutionary fight in Central America) in 1971 and En las trincheras de a lucha por el socialismo (In the trenches of the fight for Socialism) in 1975. In 1977, she was invited to attend a tribute held in her honor at the National Autonomous University of Honduras. She attended the event, which represented the first time she had returned to Central America in over three decades. After the tribute, a collective feminist group called Graciela Amaya García (GAG) was founded by a group of women at the university to honor and recognize García's contribution to women's rights and education in the country. Their goal was to educate their members on feminist ideals.

== Death and legacy ==
García died on 11 October 1995 in Mexico City, at age 100. She is remembered in Honduras as the founder of the women's movement and throughout Central America for her fight for laborers.
