= Gladys Lanza =

Honduran feminist and human rights activist

- Gladys Lanza with IM-Defensoras
- Born: 1942; Tegucigalpa, Honduras
- Died: 20 September 2016 (aged 73–74); Tegucigalpa, Honduras
- Occupations: Trade unionist; human rights activist, feminist

Gladys Lanza (1942 – 17 September 2016) was a feminist and human rights activist from Honduras.

== Biography ==
Lanza was born in Tegucigalpa, Honduras, in 1942.

=== Trade unionism ===
Lanza's political activism began as part of the Honduran trade union movement. In the 1990s Lanza was president of the Workers Union of the National Electric Power Company (STENEE), during which time she led the union's resistance to privatisation. Previously, Lanza had been vice-president of the Central Federation of Free Trade Unions of Honduras and secretary for the United Federation of Workers of Honduras. She was also active in the communist party.

She was held political prisoner by the government of Honduras in the 1980s based on bogus evidence. Her name was listed as a target for paramilitary dissidents and in 1991 her house was destroyed by a bomb.

=== Feminism ===
Lanza joined the Movimiento de Mujeres por la Paz (Honduran Women's Committee for Peace "Visitación Padilla"), which is collective of women from Honduras who advocate for gender equality, work against gender violence and support women's participation in public life. Involved from its beginning in 1984, she later became its Secretary. It was founded to honour the Honduran feminist Visitación Padilla. The organisation was one of several Honduran feminist groups which opposed the 2009 coup d'état. She was active in the Platform for Women against Femicides, which was supported by the British government. In 2010 the Inter-American Court of Human Rights ordered the Honduran government to guarantee the protection of Lanza, due to the continuing persecution.

"For us, any woman who dies in any part of the world is as affront to our rights - the right to life, rights of living without violence, a life of freedom - that is our fight."

=== Sexual harassment case ===
In 2009, Lanza and the Visitación Padilla took on the case of Lesbia Pacheco, who was sacked from her role in government after rejecting the sexual harassment of a senior official, Juan Carlos Reyes. Investigation into Reyes' charges was 'lost in the system' and in protest Visitación Padilla organised a demonstration where Reyes was denounced. Lanza took part in the protest, was charged with defamation and was found guilty. She was sentenced to 18 months in prison in 2015. The sentencing meant she was no longer legally able to work for Visitación Padilla. After her prosecution feminist groups from within Honduras called for a pardon, using the campaign slogan "We Are All Gladys".

=== Death ===
Lanza died in September 2016, after 10 days in hospital in Tegucigalpa; however, her health had badly deteriorated since her 2015 sentencing. After her death the Mesoamerican Initiative of Women Human Rights Defenders (IM-Defensoras) published a statement accusing the Honduran government of causing Lanza's death by continuing its "cruel and inhuman treatment to the extent of propitiating her death, by unnecessarily sustaining and prolonging an absurd, groundless court case aimed at inhibiting her right and the right of all Honduran women to defend their rights". This was coupled with calls for the pardoning of the charges that she had been imprisoned for by national and international organisations.

=== Pardon ===
In May 2017 judicial proceedings against Lanza were indefinitely suspended by the Supreme Court of Justice in Honduras.

== Recordings of Lanza's speeches ==
- "Gladys Lanza: Day is a Time to Remember Ongoing Fight", VOA, 2016-03-07
- "Inside The Americas - The Case of Gladys Lanza", Daily Motion.
