= Juan Pablo Wainwright =

Juan Pablo Wainwright Nuila (1894–February 18, 1932) was a Honduran revolutionary leader. A former member of the Canadian Army in World War I, he joined the Communist Party in El Salvador in 1928. He was expelled from the country that year, returning to Honduras. He was later identified as one of the major communist agitators in Latin America. After an escape from a Honduran prison in 1930, he was arrested in Guatemala in January 1932. Following a confrontation between Wainwright and Guatemalan dictator Jorge Ubico in a prison office, Ubico ordered Wainwright's execution.

== Youth ==
Wainwright was born in Santa Barbara in 1894. He was born to an English father (hailing from Leeds) and a Honduran mother Carlota Nuila Leiva. Many of Wainwright's biographical details remain unclear. According to Robert J. Alexander, Wainwright was imprisoned in the United States for a period. After his release, he joined the Canadian Army and fought at the battlefront in France during the First World War. According to Alexander's account, he travelled across Europe, Africa and the Orient, returning to Honduras in 1924.

According to biographer Rina Villars, Wainwright spent much of his youth years in Manchester living with his aunt and uncle. In 1916 he joined the British Corps of Royal Engineers for a short period. He travelled a lot, working as a sailor and in other professions. After returning to Central America, he set up a business in El Salvador selling fire extinguishers and Smith Corona typewriters. During these years he travelled extensively throughout the region. He fathered a son, William, in Barbados.

== Communist organizer ==
In 1928 he became a member of the Communist Party in El Salvador. In the same year, he was expelled from El Salvador for political reasons. After his return to Honduras he began to organize workers at the United Fruit Company plantations in northern Honduras through the Federación Sindical Hondureña (Honduran Trade Union Federation). An article in a Guatemalan newspaper labelled him as one of the foremost communist agitators in Central America, accusing him of seeking to establish a Soviet federation in the region. Apart from politics, he also set up a business in San Pedro Sula, selling tobacco, sweets and soft drinks.

== Jail and escape ==
Following a violent strike movement in Honduras in 1930 he was jailed, but managed to escape to Guatemala. Wainwright used his family business, the sweets and tobacco company Hondusal, for his cross-border activities. In Guatemala he used the pseudonym Nicolás Guerra. In February 1931 he was elected as External Relations Secretary of the Communist Party of Guatemala, at a clandestine party plenary held at the General Cemetery of Guatemala City.

== Execution ==
In January 1932 he was jailed in Guatemala, accused of preparing a revolt in the country on the lines of the insurgency in El Salvador. At the office of the prison, a heated discussion took place between Wainwright and the Guatemalan dictator Jorge Ubico during which Wainwright spat in the face of Ubico. Ubico ordered the execution of Wainwright for February 18, 1932. Prior to his execution Wainwright tried to commit suicide in his cell, writing 'Long live the Communist International!' on the walls of his prison cell with his own blood. The following day Wainwright was executed by a firing squad.

The death of Wainwright contributed to the emerging vacuum of leadership of the labour movement on the Honduran north coast.

== See also ==
- History of Honduras

== Bibliography ==
- Villars, Rina. Lealtad y rebeldía: la vida de Juan Pablo Wainwright. Tegucigalpa, Honduras: Guaymuras, 2010.
