= Census in Albania =

2017 population pyramid of Albania, from UN estimates.

Since the proclamation of Independence on November 28, 1912, Albania has organized 12 population censuses. The first official census was conducted on November 15, 1923, and was restricted to a mere population count. Because knowledge about the age of the citizens was missing at the time, only the main population characteristics were collected. However, the censuses of 1923 and later 1930 made up the basis for setting up a kind of vital population register by age and gender. From 1945 to 1960, the censuses followed more or less the same methodology. The most important objective of the 1945 census was to lay the basis for the civil population registry, the so-called Population Fundamentals Book. These early censuses were all conducted by using a "freezing day" approach, i.e. no one was allowed to leave their home until the enumerator had completed the interview. During the time period from 1969 to 1989, the censuses continued to be conducted on the prerequisite that everyone needed to be present during the interview. The 1923–1960 censuses all collected general information on population characteristics to build up and to consolidate the civil population registry, while censuses conducted during the 1969–1989 period had more elaborate questionnaires with questions related to the socio-economic characteristics of the population. At that time, differences between the civil registration data and the population census were minor due to the absence of migration. The recent Population and Housing Censuses of 2001–2023 were carried out in compliance with international recommendations from Eurostat and the UNECE statistical division. For the census of 2023, data were collected digitally for the first time. Due to the COVID-19 pandemic and problems with the acquisition of the tablets, the census was first postponed to 2022 and then to 2023.

== National censuses ==
No.	Date	Total Population	% change	By gender		Density per km^{2}	Households		Urban pop. %
No.	Date	Total Population	% change	Males	Females	Density per km^{2}	Total	Ave. size	Urban pop. %
1st Census	15.11.1923	814,380	—	421,618	392,762	28.3	143,065	5.7	15.9%
2nd Census	25.05.1930	833,618	+26.1%	428,959	404,659	28.9	146,249	5.7	—
3rd Census	30.09.1945	1,122,044	+3.4%	570,361	551,683	39.0	196,850	5.7	21.3%
4th Census	03.09.1950	1,218,943	+8.2%	625,935	593,008	42.4	211,613	5.8	20.5%
5th Census	02.10.1955	1,391,499	+13.2%	713,316	678,183	48.4	251,756	5.5	27.5%
6th Census	02.10.1960	1,626,315	+15.5%	831,294	795,021	56.5	279,805	5.8	30.9%
7th Census	01.04.1969	2,068,155	+23.9%	1,062,931	1,005,224	71.9	346,588	6.0	31.5%
8th Census	07.01.1979	2,590,600	+22.4%	1,337,400	1,253,200	90.1	463,333	5.6	33.5%
9th Census	12.04.1989	3,182,417	+20.5%	1,638,074	1,544,343	110.7	675,456	4.7	35.5%
10th Census	01.04.2001	3,069,275	-3.6%	1,530,443	1,538,832	106.7	726,895	4.2	42.1%
11th Census	01.10.2011	2,821,977	-8.3%	1,403,059	1,397,079	98.1	722,600	3.9	53.1%
12th Census	18.09.2023	2,402,113	-14.9%	1,190,448	1,211,665	83.6	755,950	3.2	—

== See also ==
- Demographics of Albania
- INSTAT

== Notes ==
- In the 2011 census, 21,839 respondents declined to participate.
