= School life expectancy =

UNESCO development statistic

School life expectancy is a measure of how many years of education a child of school-entering age would receive during their lifetime if the school enrollment rates stay the same as of today. It is computed by UNESCO Institute for Statistics and is used by statisticians and organisations to compare and assess the development of nations.
