= Romani people in Albania =

Ethnic group

Total population
- ≈ 90,000-100,000

Regions with significant populations
- Tirana, Durrës, Elbasan, Fier, Vlorë, Sarandë, Laç, Shkodër, Berat, Gjirokastër and Korça

Languages
- Balkan Romani, Vlax Romani, Albanian

Religion
- Islam, Eastern Orthodoxy, Romani mythology

Romani people in Albania (Albanian: Romët në Shqipëri) are believed to constitute a large minority in Albania, though in the country's official census in 2011, only 8301 were counted in what was reported to be a deliberate undercounting by Albanian authorities.

== Terminology ==
Ethnic Albanians have historically used various different names to refer to Romani people, most of them today being considered offensive, including:

- Gabel ("stranger", the word coming from a Kalbelia tribe root), occasionally used to distinguish the traditionally nomadic and less assimilated Roma Albanian
- Magjup (related to the supposed origin in Egypt),
- Evgjit/Jevg (also related to a supposed origin in Egypt),
- Arixhi (bear tamer, previously an occupation also taken by Roma in Romania and Turkey) predominantly used in Southern dialects,
- Kurbat (referring to Gurbeti emigration and used around Korça),
- Qifto (of Greek origin and typically used in Gjirokaster),
- Cergetar/Cergar (of Turkish origin and meaning "tent-dweller").

Among the Romani, the term "white hand" may be used to refer to ethnic Albanians as well as other non-Roma minorities such as Greeks, Aromanians and Slavs.

== History ==
=== Origin ===
The Romani people originate from Northern India, presumably from the northwestern Indian states Rajasthan and Punjab.

The linguistic evidence has indisputably shown that roots of Romani language lie in India: the language has grammatical characteristics of Indian languages and shares with them a big part of the basic lexicon, for example, body parts and daily routines.

More exactly, Romani shares the basic lexicon with Hindi and Punjabi. It shares many phonetic features with Marwari, while its grammar is closest to Bengali.

Genetic findings in 2012 suggest the Romani originated in northwestern India and migrated as a group. According to a genetic study in 2012, the ancestors of present scheduled tribes and scheduled caste populations of northern India, traditionally referred to collectively as the Ḍoma, are the likely ancestral populations of the modern European Roma.

In February 2016, during the International Roma Conference, the Indian Minister of External Affairs Sushma Swaraj stated that the people of the Roma community were children of India. The conference ended with a recommendation to the Government of India to recognize the Roma community spread across 30 countries as a part of the Indian diaspora.

=== Migration to Albania ===
The Romani probably first settled in Albania around the late 14th century or early 15th century. The oldest attestation of Romani people in Albania is from 1635, and they may have been present since the 12th and 13th centuries.

=== Ottoman Era ===
The Ottoman era saw the conversion of most Roma populations in Albania as well as the surrounding territories to Islam. Ottoman rule set up a millet system by which the right of Christians to practice their religion was legally protected, but they were given second class citizenship with higher taxes, inability to bear witness against Muslims, inability to bear arms or have horses, restrictions on church building, forbidden from proselytizing, and various other restrictions, factors which ultimately induced conversions to Islam. Additionally, responding to seasonal rebellions, there were episodes where regional governors in Albanian territories coerced conversions, despite such compulsion being traditionally prohibited by Islamic and Ottoman law. For these reasons, the majority of Roma in Albania and most neighboring regions converted to Islam, as did much of the surrounding Albanian and Slavic populations with the exception of certain regions.

Under certain Ottoman rulers, Muslim Roma were considered to not be proper Muslims because of certain ritual differences, and they were taxed and discriminated against in similar ways to Christians. Under Mehmed IV, a tax was placed on dead Roma that would continue to be paid until enough had been gathered from living Roma to replace their supposed dues, while other rulers made attempts to "reeducate" Roma. There were also cases where the presence of Roma was forbidden in mosques or cemeteries.

In the late Ottoman Empire, Aromanians, Albanians and Roma shared an "oppressed" position of being socioeconomically disadvantaged minority populations inhabiting a crumbling state. In this way, the Ottoman era has been considered one of relative "equality" for the Roma and gadjo populations in Albania, with the two populations typically living peacefully in harmony, with Roma camps typically being located on the outskirts of Albanian cities.

=== Early independence era ===
In the late 19th and early 20th century, many Roma, mostly Muslims, fled areas that were newly independent from the Ottomans, where as Muslims they were identified as "Ottoman collaborators". Roma came to Albania especially from Macedonia, Kosovo and Serbia. Roma also fled to Albania from Romania where they had recently been enslaved, to settle in Albania and other territories still under Ottoman control.

Even after Albania itself achieved independence from the Ottoman Empire, the Roma had a better situation than in Yugoslavia, but they were still treated with contempt, with large socioeconomic gaps between Roma and Albanians, segregated neighborhoods, and "practically no intermarriages between Roma and non-Roma"

=== During World War II ===
Unlike in many Eastern European countries, and similarly to Jews in Albania, Roma were not harshly persecuted and/or sent to death camps in Albania during the Second World War. For most of the duration of the war, Albania was under the control of an Italian puppet regime. Roma did participate in the war, with many fighting in the Albanian military, and Roma in Albania, Macedonia and Kosovo were typically supportive of the Italians and the Albanian authorities. However, although left mostly untouched by both the Italians and by Albanian nationalists, the Roma were persecuted during the brief German occupation of Albania in 1943, although the shortness of the German presence limited the damage they were able to wreak upon the Roma population.

=== Under Communism ===
Enver Hoxha imposed a harsh Stalinist regime upon Albania, attempting to homogenize the population by repressing religious and cultural differences. Although as a minority the Roma were supposedly accorded benefits and protections, in reality this was not always the case, and in 1960, Prime Minister Mehmet Shehu tried to ban Roma from entering Albanian towns.

=== After Communism ===
Despite inequalities and suppression during the communist era, the collapse of communism brought more misfortune to Roma, as they were the first to be heavily unemployed and rapidly fell to the bottom of society; as a result many Roma today are nostalgic for the days of communism.

In the late 1990s, Roma began temporarily migrating to Greece where they found more employment opportunities, beginning a recurrent pattern of seasonal Roma migration to Greece from Albania.

== Demographics ==
According to Robert Elsie, the Romani number between 60,000 and 100,000 people. A 1994 estimation put the number at 95,000 Roma in Albania. The ERRC estimates 120,000 Roma in Albania. The most recent 2011 census counted 8301 Romani in Albania but it has been accused of drastically undercounting the number of Romani in the country, drawing criticism from the Council of Europe.

Roma people live all over the country, but some of the biggest communities can be found around the capital, Tirana, the villages of Fier, as well as the cities of Berat and Gjirokaster, and around the town of Korça.

== Socioeconomics ==
The poverty rate among Roma in Albania is particularly high (78%) when compared to the Albanian poverty rate (22%).

Contrary to the expectations of many foreigners, investigations have found that discrimination against Roma in Albania is typically subtle rather than overt, and Roma typically do not face any open discrimination. In some cases, relations between Roma on one hand and the Albanian majority and other "gadjo" groups on the other are often quite cordial in the rural, traditional and "non-profit life" and both the majority of the Albanian intelligentsia and the working class are said to typically have positive views of Roma, who rarely if ever are cast as an "ethnic enemy". On the other hand, "gadjos" may be reluctant to accept Roma as equals in the urban and "profit-making life". However, Roma may suffer from the refusal to recognize the distinctness of their identity and traditions while Roma complain that although Albanians do not openly express derision, they may view Roma as poor, dirty, stupid, noisy and involved in theft, and as a result they are widely but tacitly discriminated against in the job market.

During the communist period, Roma of Gjirokastra, Korça, Tirana and Berati worked in handcraft enterprises. However, eventually demand for their products declined, and the enterprises were mostly shut down as Albania transitioned away from communism.

In 2007, it was written by a Roma organization that about 90% of Roma are unemployed, 40% of Roma have bad living conditions, 20% don't have the resources necessary to buy medicine, 40% of Roma families ask their kids to work rather than complete education to fulfill primary familial needs, and that the literacy rate of Roma has fallen since the end of communism, and is now 47.6%, with more women illiterate than men, with all these problems being attributed to a "bustle for racism".

In Albania, the Romani population keeps dealing with a much higher chance of becoming stateless. Over the past few years, Tirana Legal Aid Society (TLAS) and Roma Active Albania have been teaming up with ENS and its partners throughout the Western Balkans to try to fix these problems that affect Roma communities.

== Language ==
On the other hand, currently there is no schooling for Roma in their native language.

== Çengies ==
The term "Çengies" refers to Romani women in Albania known for dancing for wealthy Albanian beys during the Ottoman Empire and under King Zog's reign. They were recognized for their entertainment skills, often performing at elite social events. During the Ottoman Empire, the Çengies found a niche in performance arts despite facing marginalization. Under King Zog (1928-1939), they continued to perform, adapting to societal changes while maintaining their cultural heritage. Relationships between Çengies and Albanian men led to children with mixed Romani and Albanian identities. These offspring navigated complex cultural dynamics, sometimes integrating into Albanian society while retaining elements of their Romani background. Today, the legacy of the Çengies is part of Albania's cultural history, highlighting both contributions to dance and ongoing issues of discrimination faced by Romani communities.

== Culture ==
Roma culture is distinguishable from the culture of the ethnic Albanian majority, as well as those of other minorities such as Aromanians and Greeks, in a number of ways.

An important distinction is made between the Roma individual and the gadjo, a non-Roma, with a Roma necessarily being someone of Roma blood and/or someone who consistently demonstrates membership in and solidarity with the Roma people—in this way, although in the Carpathian Mountains the definition of Roma is strictly based on blood, in Albania and surrounding Balkan areas, a child of gadjo blood who was raised in a Roma family and in Roma culture and demonstrates consistent solidarity with the Roma is viewed as a proper Rom individual, whereas a Roma who has abandoned their roots is not, while the identification of "half-breed Roma" as either Roma or gadjo is done solely based on their adherence to Roma values.

Gender relations are patriarchal, as is also true among Albanians, but patriarchal values have been described as much stricter among the Roma than among ethnic Albanians, although this could be because of recent cultural change among the ethnic Albanian population. Sexual mores among the Roma have similarly been described as much more "puritan" than among Albanians.

Roma public life has been described as very communal, with most things considered to be belonging to the community rather than the individual.

Tallava constitutes a musical genre performed by the Romani community in Albania, characterized by its performance in the Albanian language.

=== The Fis ===
Roma social order revolves around the fis, a borrowed Albanian word that in the Roma context refers to a "tribe" based on close familial kinship.

=== Marriage ===
It has long been taboo for Roma to marry non-Roma, and indeed the large majority of Roma prefer to marry their group rather than with the other major Roma people. Roma marriages were in fact typically done within the same fis, although some members of the youngest generation are now disregarding this custom.

The virginity of the female before marriage is considered to be of utmost importance, and a marriage may be called off if it is discovered that the female is not in fact a virgin. Partly for this reason, girls are typically married young, between the ages of 13 and 15, while males are married between the ages of 16 and 18. Although the desires of the teenage spouses are rarely taken into account, if a son says he is in love with a particular Roma girl, his feelings may be considered, although the same is rarely true for girls. An unmarried woman who has reached 20 is often thought to be doomed to be left at home unmarried. Matchmaking for marriages is typically carried out without the consent of the two spouses, and orchestrated by a matchmaker who is experienced in matchmaking. When wishing to make a proposal on behalf of his son, a father customarily goes to the house of the desired wife, and states "we have come to seek a piece of bread". Weddings, meanwhile, typically consist of feasts, dancing and music, and take place on Saturday or Sunday. They are often not recognized because the spouses are typically below the Albanian legal age of marriage. Roma rarely if ever have religious leaders preside over weddings.

=== Religion ===
The majority of Roma in Albania are cultural Muslims, having converted during the Ottoman era. A minority of Roma are Christians belonging to the Albanian Orthodox Church.

The feast of Saint George, celebrated on the sixth of May, is an occasion of paramount importance for Muslim and Christian Roma alike, and Saint George is seen as the symbol of the Roma people.

=== Traditions ===
The traditional dress of Roma is starkly different from that of Albanians, and is perceived by Roma as a major symbol of their identity and their differentiation from ethnic Albanians. Roma women typically wearing blouses with printed flowers and embroidered gold threads. At weddings and other traditional events, women wear dressed decorated with gold threads and roses, older men wear dark red suits, and younger men wear flower-printed shirts.

Handcrafts have also long been an important part of the economic culture of Roma, with 15% of Roma being involved in their production as of 2005. Handcraft production used to be a major part of the Roma economy, but with the collapse of communism, many Roma handcraft enterprises also floundered, and conditions of dire poverty created situation where it was difficult for Roma to pass down their traditional handcraft making customs.

Roma folkdances and music are considered an important part of Roma culture and another distinguishing factor. The majority of Roma neighborhoods have individuals who are professional musicians present. Roma musicians acknowledge in particular notable Turkish and Greek influences on their music, with Greek pop music more recently being very influential due to the regular immigration to Greece, so much so that it is accused of "eroding Roma culture" in some quarters.

Although traditional Roma folktales had long been passed down through the generations, today this custom is eroding as only a minority of Roma remember the folktales. In attempt to stem this cultural loss, publications have been made of the local Roma folklore, but they are made in Albanian, not in the Romani language.

== Notable people ==
- Mandi Nishtulla, musician

== See also ==
- Ashkali and Balkan Egyptians
- Romani people in Kosovo
- Romani people in North Macedonia
