= Leca =

Leca or LECA may refer to:

== Acronyms ==
- Last eukaryotic common ancestor
- Lightweight expanded clay aggregate
- Lutheran Evangelical Church in Africa—Zambia Diocese

== Places ==
- Leča, a village in Novi Pazar, Serbia
- Leça da Palmeira a former civil parish in the Greater Porto area, Portugal
  - Leça Lighthouse
- Leca, a village in Antonești, Cantemir, Moldova

== People ==
- Leca of Cătun (before 1599–1616), Wallachian political figure
- Béatrice Leca (born 1970), French writer
- Daniel Leca (born 1985), French politician
- Francine Leca (1938-2024), French surgeon and professor
- Grégory Leca (born 1980), French footballer
- Haralamb Lecca (or Leca), (1873–1920), Romanian poet and playwright
- Jean-Louis Leca (born 1985), French footballer
- Marius Leca (born 2000), Romanian footballer
- Mickaël Leca (born 1994), French footballer
- Mihai Leca (born 1992), Romanian footballer
- Ricangel de Leça (born 1981), Aruban football referee and former player

== Other uses ==
- Leça F.C., a football club in Leça da Palmeira, Portugal
- Battle of Leça, a 1684 military encounter between Portuguese and Castilian forces

== See also ==
- Lecca, a given name and surname
- Lecka (disambiguation)
- Leka (disambiguation)
