= Leka (name) =

Leka is a male name and surname. In the Balkans, it has spread in the forms Lecca (Romanian), Lekkas (Greek), Lekić (Serbo-Croatian).

== Given name ==
- Leka (Paulician leader), Byzantine Paulician, possibly of Albanian birth
- Lekë Dukagjini, Albanian Nobleman who canonized the Kanun
- Lekë Matrënga (1567–1619) was an Arbëresh writer and Catholic priest of Byzantine rite in the Albanian community of Sicily
- Leca of Cătun, Wallachian political figure of Albanian origin, prominent under Princes Michael the Brave, Radu Șerban, and Radu Mihnea
- Lekë Zaharia, Arbëresh writer
- Lekë Dushmani, one of the founders of the League of Lezhë
- Leka, Crown Prince of Albania, only son of King Zog I and Queen Geraldine of Albania
- Leka, Prince of Albania, the claimant to the defunct throne of Albania and the head of the House of Zogu
- Leka Mini Baridam, Nigerian taekwondo practitioner
- Leka Bungo (1944–2025), Albanian director, actor, and screenwriter
- Leka Gjiknuri (1942–1998), member of the Academy of Natural Sciences in New York and Paris
- Leka Ndoja (born 1962), Albanian researcher of literature and history and an Albanian translator
- Leka Tuʻungafasi, Tongan rugby union player

== Surname ==
- Dhora Leka (1923–2006), Albanian composer and political prisoner
- Gazmend Leka, Albanian painter, artistic director and scholar
- Jeff Leka, American racing driver
- Kaisa Leka (born 1978), Finnish comic artist and politician from Porvoo
- Paul Leka (1943–2011), American songwriter, record producer, pianist, arranger and orchestrator

== See also ==
- Lek (disambiguation)
- Lekaj
- Lecca
