= Antonești =

Antonești may refer to:

- Antonești, a village in Călinești Commune, Teleorman County, Romania
- Antoneşti, a commune in Cantemir District, Moldova
- Antoneşti, a commune in Ștefan Vodă District, Moldova
