= Lekaj (surname) =

Lekaj is a surname.

== Surname ==
- Adrijana Lekaj (born 1995), Kosovan-Croatian tennis player
- Elmir Lekaj (born 2000), Albanian footballer
- Ermina Lekaj Prljaskaj (born 1971), Kosovar-born Croatian politician and lawyer
- Granit Lekaj (born 1990), Kosovan-Swiss footballer
- Pal Lekaj (born 1962), Kosovan politician and medical doctor
- Rocky Lekaj (born 1989), Kosovan-Norwegian footballer
- Senad Lekaj (born 1989), Albanian footballer

== See also ==
- Lecca, Romanian
- Lekkas Greek
- Lekić, Serbo-Croatian
- Lek (disambiguation)
- Leka (name)
- Lecca
