= Leka =

Leka may refer to:

== People ==
=== As a personal name ===
- Leka, Crown Prince of Albania (1939–2011), also known as King Leka I, son of Zog I of Albania
- Leka, Prince of Albania (born 1982), also known as King Leka II, grandson of Zog I of Albania and son of Leka I
- Leka, 11th century Paulician leader
- Leca of Cătun, 17th century military commander
- Lekë Dukagjini, 15th century aristocrat, leader of the League of Lezhë
- Lekë Matrënga, 17th century writer
- Lekë Zaharia, 15th century aristocrat
- Lekë Dushmani, 15th century aristocrat

=== As a surname ===
- Lecca in Romania and Moldova
- Lekkas/Lekka (fem.) in Greece
- Jeff Leka, American racing driver
- Paul Leka (1943–2011), an American songwriter, record producer, and musician
- Gazmend Leka is an Albanian painter and artistic director and scholar

== Places ==
- Léka, a castle of the kingdom of Hungary
- Léka, a town in the district of Oberpullendorf in the state of Burgenland in Austria
- Leka, Ethiopia, a town in Ethiopia
- Leka Municipality, a municipality in Trøndelag county, Norway
- Leka (island), an island in Leka Municipality in Trøndelag county, Norway
- Leka Church, a church in Leka Municipality in Trøndelag county, Norway

== Ships ==
- MS Solfjord, previously MS Leka
- MS Frøyaferja (1976), previously MS Leka II
- MS Leka (2001), the current ferry carrying the name

== See also ==
- Łęka (disambiguation), name of a number of places in Poland
- Lecka (disambiguation)
- Leca (disambiguation)
