= King Leka =

King Leka may refer to:

- Leka, Crown Prince of Albania (1939–2011), also known as King Leka I, son of Zog I of Albania; father of Leka II
- Leka, Prince of Albania, also known as King Leka II, grandson of Zog I of Albania, son of Leka I

== See also ==
- Leka (disambiguation)
