= Lecka (disambiguation) =

Lecka may refer to:

- Lecka, a village in south-eastern Poland
- Anna Łęcka (born 1980), Polish archer
- Izabela Łęcka, a fictional character from the novel The Doll (Prus novel)
- Ola Łęcka, a fictional character from the Polish TV show M jak miłość
- Leckava, a town in Lithuania

== See also ==
- Leca (disambiguation)
- Leka (disambiguation)
