= Lekaj =

Lekaj may refer to:

- Lekaj, Albania, a village
- Lekaj (surname), an Albanian name
