= Albanians in Bulgaria =

Ethnic minority

Albanians in Bulgaria Shqiptarët në Bullgari Албанците в България
Total population
- 220 (2011)

Regions with significant populations
- Mandritsa, Sofia

Languages
- Albanian, Bulgarian

Religion
- Sunni Islam, Christianity

Albanians (Bulgarian: албанци, albantsi) are a minority ethnic group in Bulgaria (Albanian: Bullgaria). Although according to the 2011 census they only numbered 220, their number in the Bulgarian lands was much larger in the past. Between the 15th and 17th century, groups of Albanians (both Roman Catholic and Eastern Orthodox by confession) settled in many parts of modern northern Bulgaria, with a less numerous group of settlers in southern Thrace. Eventually, they were fully assimilated into the surrounding Bulgarian communities.

== History ==
=== Medieval ===
Leka, a Paulician leader in 11th century Plovdiv may be the first medieval Albanian to be mentioned by his name. The attestation of a Paulician Albanian suggests that Paulicians had become popular among Albanian groups. Toponymy between Sofia and Plovdiv in the 10th and 11th centuries indicates that (Proto-)Albanian populations had migrated from their native lands to the eastern Balkans before the era of Leka. Proto-Romanian toponyms in Bulgaria are found close to Proto-Albanian toponyms and names in the same regions. Their geographical proximity is explained by their common migration to Bulgaria in the early Middle Ages as shepherd populations from a wide area from northern Albania to the central Balkans. Some of the earliest Albanian settlers in modern Bulgaria were the Roman Catholic ore miners in Kopilovtsi, Montana Province, a village in the vicinity of the larger mining centre Chiprovtsi. Kopilovtsi was settled between the 15th and the 17th century; a Catholic church was built in the early 17th century. Unlike the Catholic population in other villages of the region, Kopilovtsi's residents were of Albanian origin. In 1626, the Archbishop of Bar Pjetër Mazreku claims that part of the Bulgarian Catholics are Albanians (Albanesi), Saxons and Paulicians. According to Bulgarian bishop Petar Bogdan, Kopilovtsi had 1,200 Catholics of Albanian origin who were still speaking the Albanian language in 1640. In another report from 1647, Petar Bogdan also lists 1,200 Albanian Catholics in Kopilovtsi, but notes that they have started using Slavic instead. By 1658, Petar Bogdan notes that the over 1,500 Albanians in Kopilovtsi spoke Bulgarian and only retained some traces of their original language. Kopilovtsi, along with Chiprovtsi, was depopulated with the crushing of the Chiprovtsi Uprising in 1688.

Albanian settlement in northern Bulgaria was not limited to Catholics—in a 1595 letter to the Prince of Transylvania, Ragusan merchant Pavel Đorđić notes that "in Bulgaria there are many villages inhabited by Albanians, from where 7,000 brave and well-trained men can be rallied". In the same letter, Đorđić claims that 1,500 of those Albanians lived near Tarnovo.

Indeed, the toponym Arbanasi, a village near the city of Tarnovo, is a hint at Albanian settlement in the region. Arbanasi was populated (or repopulated) in the late 15th century and as an administratively autonomous village in the Ottoman Empire attracted many settlers. It is theorized that the first settlers were around 100–200 Albanians who were brought there during Bayezid II's campaigns in Albania. These settlers were gradually Hellenized and Bulgarianized in the following centuries.

Other places in northern Bulgaria where an Albanian presence has been strongly suggested are Chervena Voda near Rousse, Poroishte near Razgrad, Dobrina near Provadia and Devnya near Varna. Albanians have been registered in the modern Bulgarian capital Sofia since the early 17th century; other possible colonies south of the Balkan Mountains included Gorno Arbanasi and Dolno Arbanasi near Asenovgrad. The most notable Albanian village in Bulgarian Thrace is Mandritsa near Ivaylovgrad, which was settled in the first half of the 17th century by settlers from near Korçë. A church was built in 1718. The village reached its demographic peak before the Balkan Wars; in 1912, it was inhabited by 1,879 people.

=== Post-Liberation activities ===
After the Liberation of Bulgaria from Ottoman rule in 1878, many Albanians arrived to the country as political immigrants. A patriotic organization of Albanians in Bulgaria, Longing, was established on 1 January 1893 in Sofia and initially had 53 members. An Albanian-language printing press was founded shortly thereafter; besides calendars and newspapers, the printing house published important patriotic works of the National Renaissance of Albania, including publications by brothers Naim Frashëri and Sami Frashëri. Most notably, the text of the Albanian national anthem, Aleksander Stavre Drenova's Hymn to the Flag, was first published in Sofia by the Freedom of Albania newspaper.

== Notable people ==
=== Politics ===
- Rıza Tevfik Bölükbaşı – Turkish philosopher, poet, politician of liberal signature and a community leader
- Vasile Lupu - Voivode of Moldavia between 1634 and 1653.

=== Art and Entertainment ===
- Lika Yanko - Bulgarian artist

=== Sports ===
- Linda Zetchiri - Bulgarian badminton player

== See also ==
- Mandritsa
- Arbanasi, Bulgaria
- Bulgarians in Albania
- Albania–Bulgaria relations
- Ethnic groups in Bulgaria
- Albanian diaspora
