= Łęka =

Łęka may refer to:

- Łęka, Gmina Łęczyca in Łódź Voivodeship (central Poland)
- Łęka, Gmina Piątek in Łódź Voivodeship (central Poland)
- Łęka, Lublin Voivodeship (east Poland)
- Łęka, Lesser Poland Voivodeship (south Poland)
- Łęka, Świętokrzyskie Voivodeship (south Poland)
- Łęka, Masovian Voivodeship (east-central Poland)
- Łęka, Greater Poland Voivodeship (central Poland)

== See also ==
- Leka (disambiguation)
