= Lockenhaus Chamber Music Festival =

Annual chamber music festival in Burgenland, Austria

- Genre: Chamber music
- Dates: July
- Locations: Lockenhaus, Burgenland, Austria
- Years active: 1981–Present
- Founders: Gidon Kremer; Monsignore Prof. Pfarrer Josef Herowitsch
- Website: Official website

The Lockenhaus Chamber Music Festival (alternate: Internationales Kammermusikfest Lockenhaus) is an annual chamber music festival located in the Austrian state of Burgenland. It is held at three venues in Lockenhaus: Burg Lockenhaus castle, Church of St. Nikolaus, and the old monastery of Lockenhaus. The New York Times has referred to as perhaps one of the "two most refined music festivals of all", and a European cultural treasure. While both older and younger talents perform, notable performers include Vladimir Ashkenazy, Nikolaus Harnoncourt, Heinz Holliger, Cho-Liang Lin, and András Schiff. According to its founder, violinist Gidon Kremer, the Lockenhaus Chamber Music Festival philosophically resembles the Marlboro Music Festival in Vermont, US.

== History ==
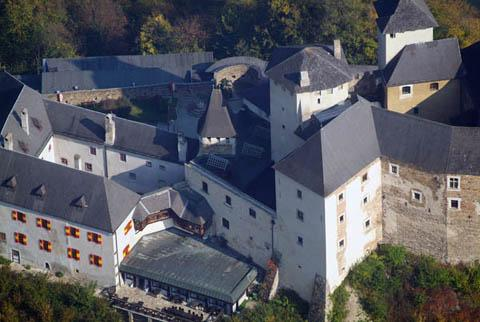
Burg Lockenhaus castle, a festival venue.

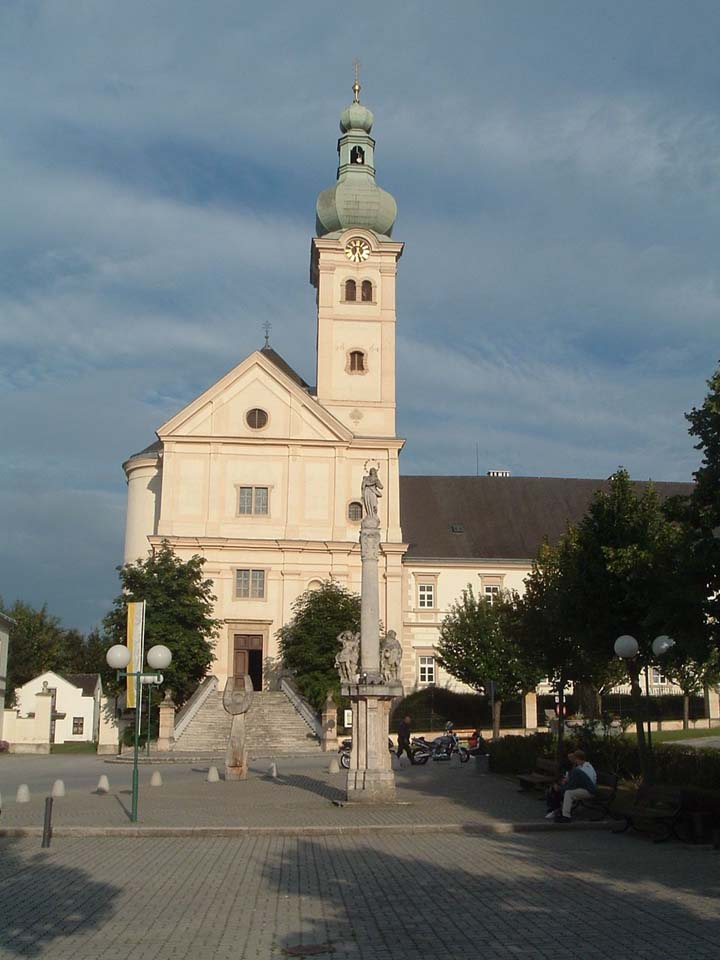
Church of St. Nicholas, a festival venue.

In 1974, Father Josef Herovitsch, an opera enthusiast, wanted to organize concerts in his parish. The first concert, "Lockenhauser Konzerte", occurred at the entrance hall of the rectory. Two years later, the Latvian violinist and conductor, Gidon Kremer, came to Lockenhaus and gave a "warm-up concert" preceding his Vienese Evening. He returned each year, bringing his Russian friends such as David Geringas, Andrei Gavrilov, Elisabeth Leonskaja, Oleg Maisenberg, and others who performed at Lockenhauser Konzerte before the founding of Lockenhaus Chamber Music Festival.

With Gidon Kremer searching for a place to develop a chamber music festival, the music loving Herowitsch offered him what he needed: two performing spaces in Lockenhaus. One was in the hall of the preserved medieval castle and the other was in the town's baroque church. Beginning in 1981, Kremer and other musicians began playing chamber music for small audiences in a less commercial, more collegial setting. By 1987, the Lockenhaus festival group included a European tour and a single American concert at the Metropolitan Museum of Art in New York City.

Kremer wanted to end his involvement with the festival in 1990 because it was an exhausting experience; the festival went through a crisis. Conceived as an intimate gathering of musical friends, it had grown to 30 concerts in two weekends with more than 60 artists. The following year, there was no festival while organizers considered how to proceed. The retooled festival, renamed the Kremerata Musica, began in 1992, but stayed in Lockenhaus. Each festival concentrates on one or two composers.

By its 30th anniversary in 2011, the featured music is that of Franz Liszt. Kremer was the Artistic Director while Herowitsch was the festival administrator. In 2011 Gidon Kremer passed on the artistic direction to the German/French Cellist Nicolas Altstaedt, who has been running the festival since then. Under his directorship the festival is touring again with a small group of artists in venues like the Mozarteum Salzburg, Musikverein Graz, Konzerthaus Wien, Concertgebouw Amsterdam and Schloss Elmau.

== Events ==
Lockenhaus is said to be a music festival like few others in the world with Vermont's Marlboro coming closest. The festival offers song recitals, solo instrumental recitals and chamber music. Most rehearsals are open to the public. A given concert's works are announced only twenty-four hours in advance. Spontaneous, 12-hour marathon concerts, interspersed with meal and rest breaks, are not uncommon.

The festival occurs in the summer and lasts for two weeks. The Lockenhaus Academy for Chamber Music occurs every other year following a tradition of promoting young musicians and composers.
