= Janczowa =

- Village
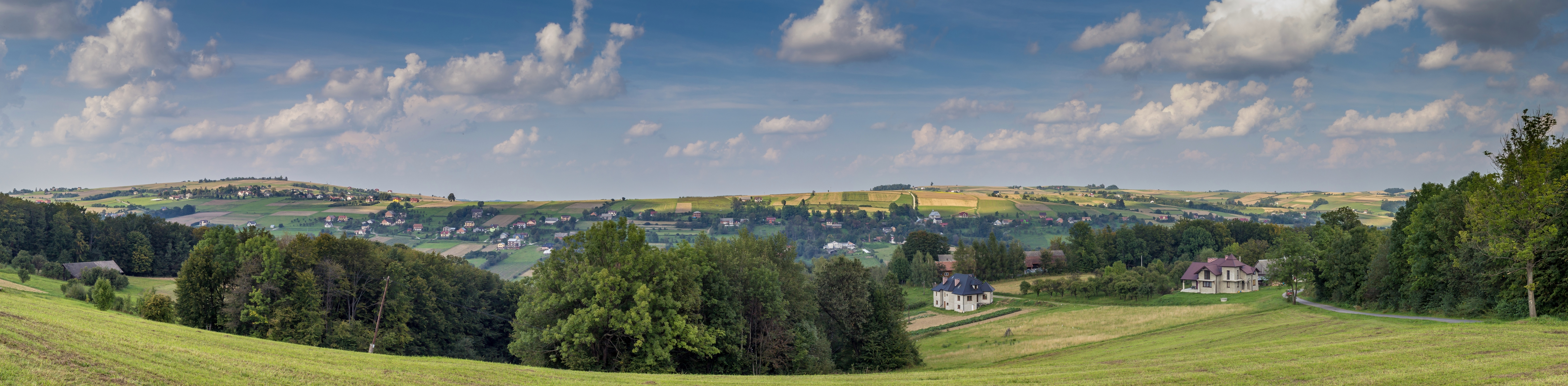
- Panorama of Janczowa

- Location within Poland
- Coordinates: 49°42′5″N 20°46′47″E
- Country: Poland
- Voivodeship: Lesser Poland
- County: Nowy Sącz
- Gmina: Korzenna

Janczowa [janˈt͡ʂɔva] is a village in the administrative district of Gmina Korzenna, within Nowy Sącz County, Lesser Poland Voivodeship, in southern Poland.
