= Lekkas =

Lekkas or Lekas (Greek: Λέκκας) is a Greek surname. The female version of the name is Lekka (Λέκκα). Notable examples include:

== Men ==
- Angelo Lekkas (born 1976), Australian rules footballer
- Marios Lekkas (born 1979), fashion model
- Vassilis Lekkas, Greek popular/folk and rock singer

== Women ==
- Christina Lekka (born c. 1972), fashion model from Akron, Ohio

== See also ==
- Lekas, a municipality in Albania
- Leka (disambiguation)
