= Church of St. Nikolaus, Lockenhaus =

Church building in Lockenhaus, Austria

Church of St. Nikolaus
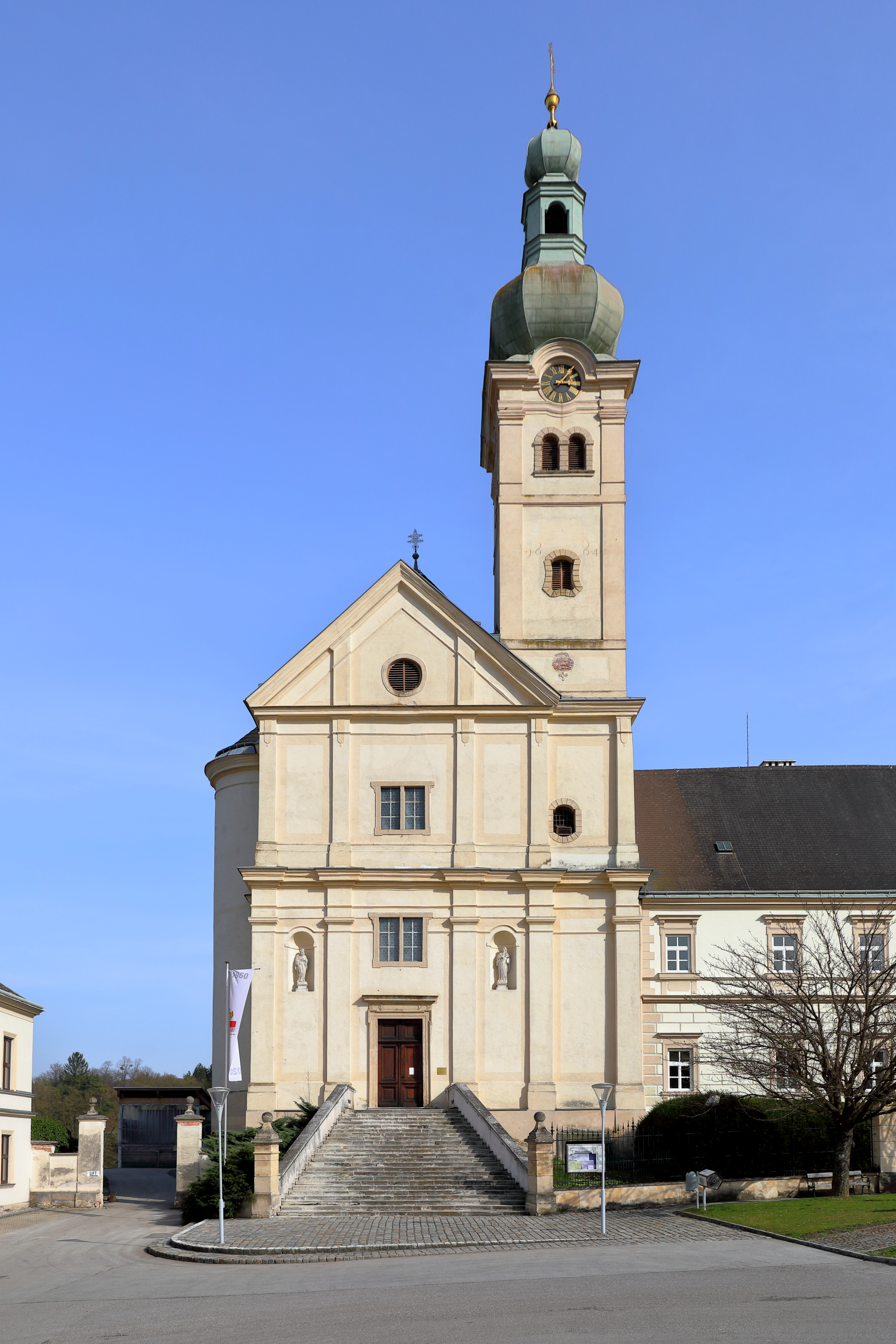

Religion
- Affiliation: Roman Catholic
- Diocese: Diocese of Eisenstadt
- Province: Archdiocese of Vienna
- Ecclesiastical or organisational status: Parish church
- Leadership: Monsignore Prof. Pfarrer Josef Herowitsch
- Year consecrated: 1669

Location
- Location: Lockenhaus, Burgenland, Austria
- Interactive map of Church of St. Nikolaus
- Coordinates: 47°24′23.47″N 16°25′9.66″E

Architecture
- Architect: Piero Orsolini
- Style: early Baroque
- Groundbreaking: 1655
- Completed: 1669

Website
- www.martinus.at

The Church of Saints Nicholas (German: Pfarrkirche zum Heiligen Nikolaus) is an early Baroque parish church located in the Güns Valley in Lockenhaus, in the Austrian state of Burgenland. It was built during the period of 1655 to 1669. Commissioned by Franz III. Nádasdy, the church was entrusted to the Augustinians and was dedicated to both St. Nicholas of Myra and St. Nicholas of Tonentino, in reference to the role of Fr. Nicholas Donellan (O.E.S.A) in Nädasdy's conversion to the Catholic faith. The parish church overlooks the town's main square.

== History ==
Count Nikolaus "Miklós" of Esterházy (1583–1645), palatine of Hungary, made a lot of efforts to win his relative and neighbour Franz III. Nádasdy (1621–1671) over to the Catholic faith. After visiting Italy and meeting with Fr Nicholas Donellan, an Augustinian from Vienna, the 22-year-old Nádasdy publicly declared his conversion to Catholicism on Nov. 25, 1643 in the church of Csepreg, setting in the Catholic restoration in his estates.

Franz III. Nádasdy commissioned the church to Piero Orsolini of Siena, whom Nádasdy met while studying in Italy, oversaw the construction over the course of 13 years. Its construction began in 1655 and the foundation stone was laid on July 2, 1656. Progress delayed when cracks were discovered on the walls. With the building finished, consecration took place in 1669.

== Architecture and fittings ==
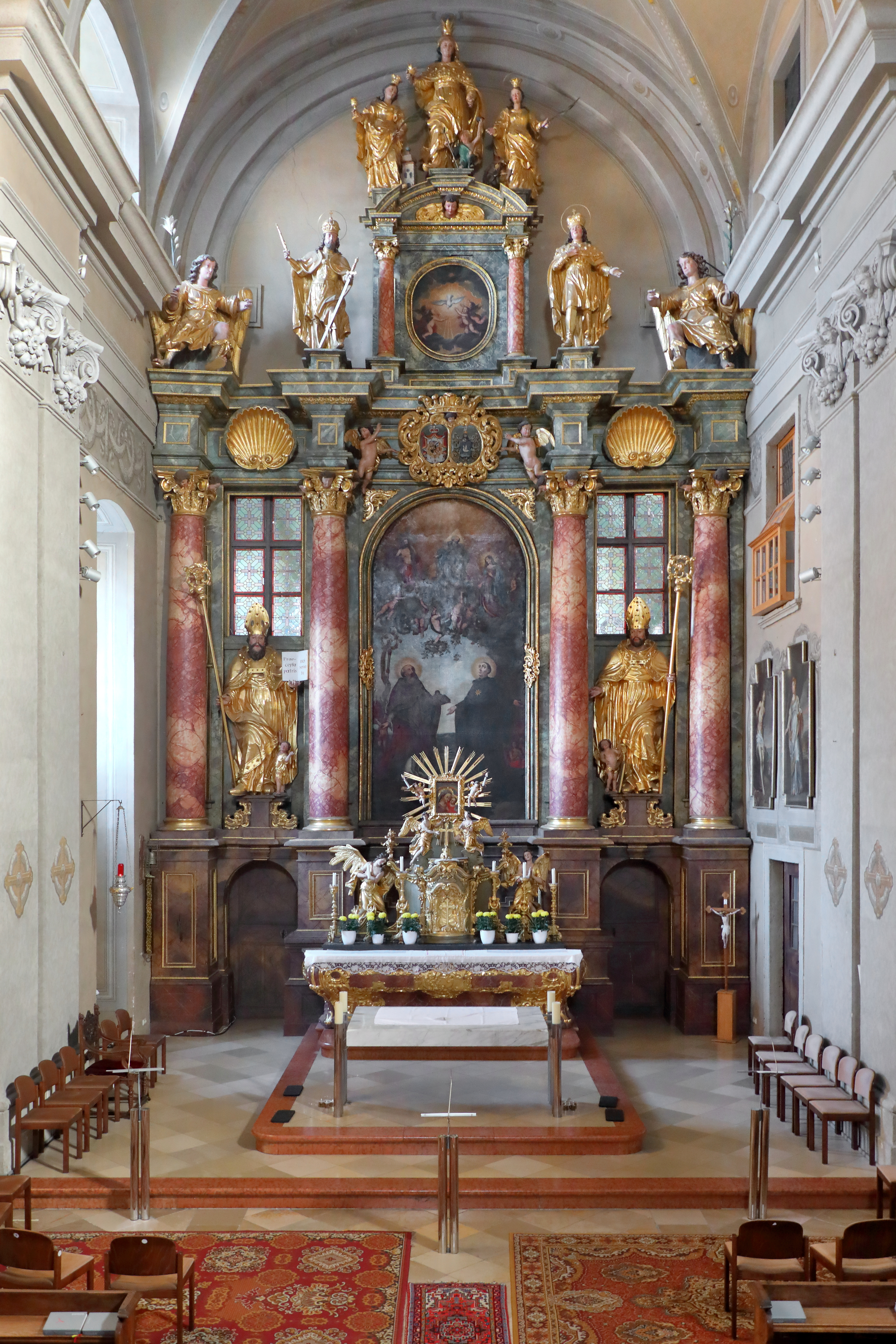
High altar of the parish and pilgrimage church

The church layout is in the shape of an elongated Greek cross. On the corners, there are chapels with semi-circular indentations. A painting by Georg Kiery of Güns, created in 1675, is located at the high altar; it depicts the church's two patron saints. There are six other altars on the sides of the church. The interior features also include a high relief of cherubs clinging to acanthus leaves.

The pulpit was a later addition; it originated at a church in Baden. A tower roof was replaced in 1769. Other renovations occurred in 1895 and 1913. In 1957, new bells were purchased. A major interior and exterior restoration began in 1986, costing more than 750,000 euros. In 2003, a new organ was installed; the largest in the region, it has 2400 pipes that range from 8 millimetres (0.31 in) to 4 metres (13 ft) in height.

A large crypt is situated beneath the nave, the final resting place of the Nádasdy and Drašković families. The crypt contains red marble tombs belonging to the Nádasdy family, the sarcophagus of Franz III. Nádasdy, and an unusual piece of artwork, a black Madonna on the altar. Several Augustinians are also buried in the crypt.

== Grounds ==
An adjoining former monastery was home to 12 monks. After its closure, one wing served as accommodation for local nobility while the other was used for administrative purposes.

== Events ==
In recent years, the church has been one of the venues for the annual Lockenhaus Chamber Music Festival. The church concert series "Musica Sacra Lockenhaus" was founded in 1998.
