= Lipnica Wielka, Nowy Sącz County =

Lipnica Wielka
- Village
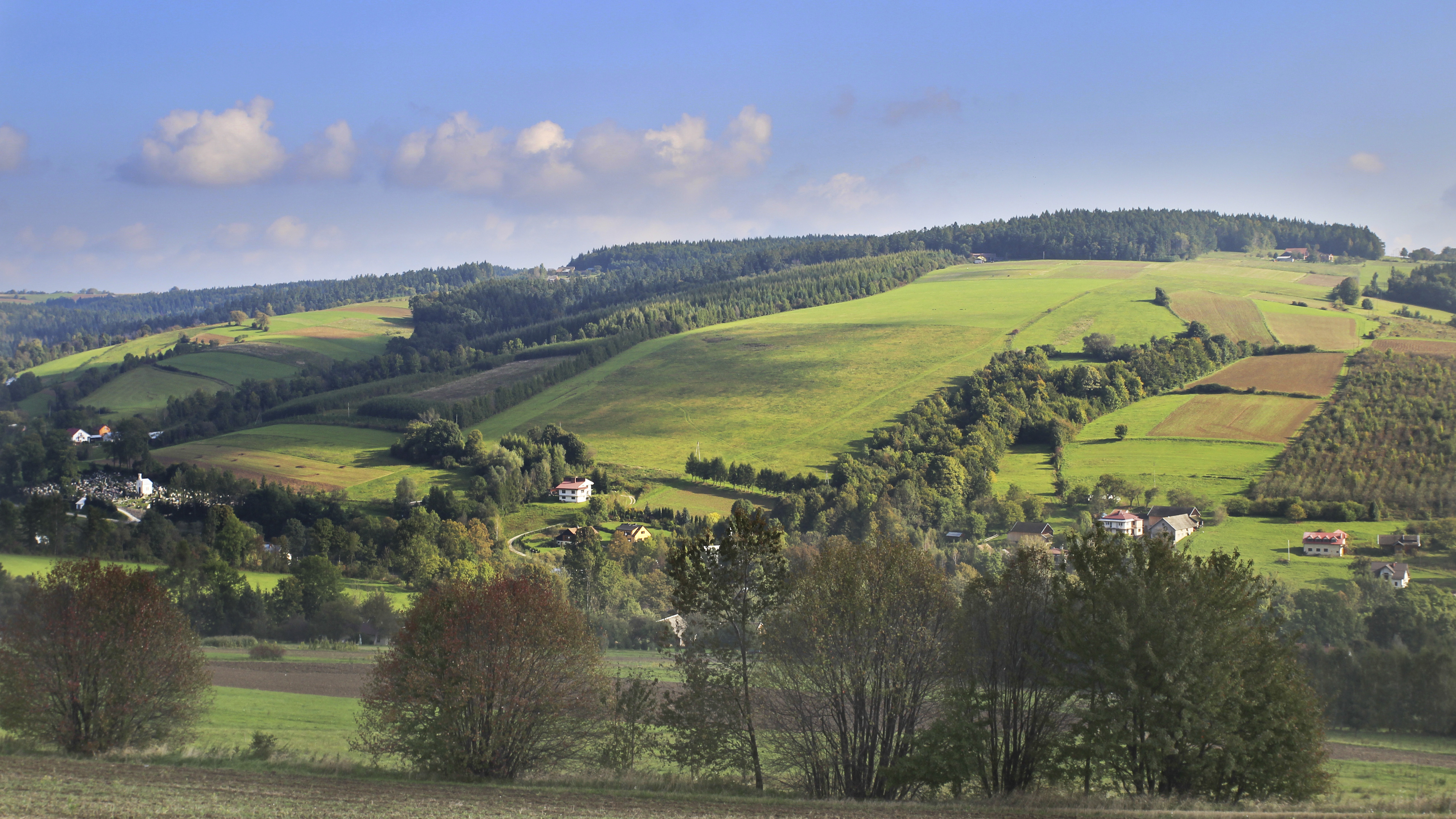
- Panorama of the part of Lipnica Wielka

- Location within Poland
- Coordinates: 49°42′32″N 20°51′50″E
- Country: Poland
- Voivodeship: Lesser Poland
- County: Nowy Sącz
- Gmina: Korzenna

Population
  - Total: 1,938

Lipnica Wielka (Polish pronunciation: [lipˈɲit͡sa ˈvjɛlka]) is a village in the administrative district of Gmina Korzenna, within Nowy Sącz County, Lesser Poland Voivodeship, in southern Poland. On 30 September 2016 a monument was erected in Lipnica Wielka commemorating the crew of the British Halifax JP-162 aircraft from the No. 148 Squadron RAF, who died during a combat flight on the night of August 4–5, 1944.
