= Burg Lockenhaus =

Castle in Burgenland, Austria

Burg Lockenhaus Leuca
- Lockenhaus, Burgenland, Austria
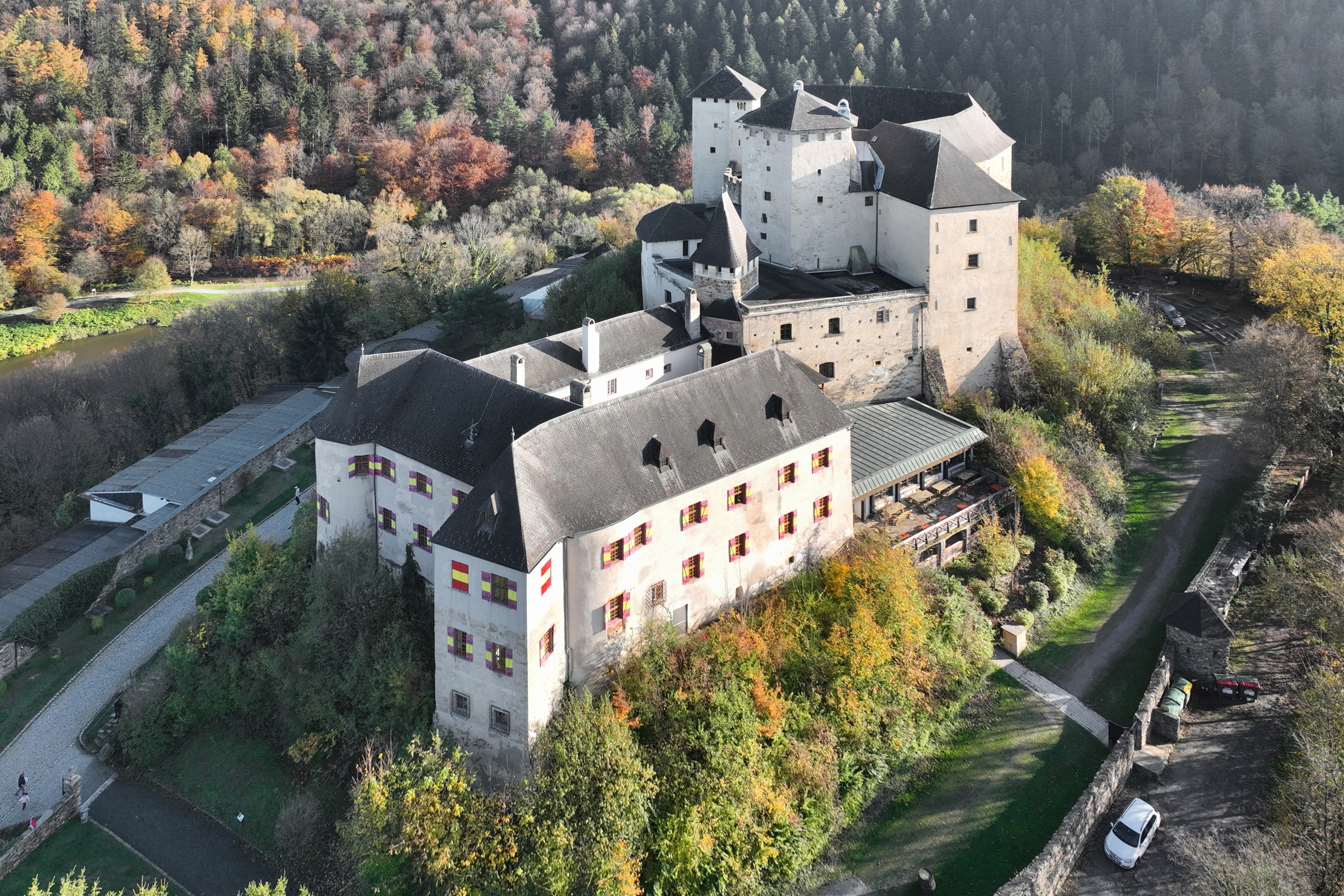
- Burg Lockenhaus

Site information
- Type: Castle
- Owner: Professor Paul Anton Keller Foundation
- Controlled by: Professor Paul Anton Keller Foundation
- Open to the public: Yes
- Condition: Refurbished

Location
- Location in Austria
- Coordinates: 47°24′14.5″N 16°25′28.5″E

Site history
- Built: About 1200 CE
- In use: Yes

Garrison information
- Occupants: Professor Paul Anton Keller Foundation

Burg Lockenhaus (Hungarian Léka) is a castle and medieval fortress in the Güns Valley in the southeastern part of Lockenhaus, in Burgenland, eastern Austria. Burg Lockenhaus is 368 metres (1,207 ft) above sea level. The castle was built in Romanesque and Gothic architectural styles around 1200, and was initially called "Leuca" or Léka. It is part of the Naturpark Geschriebenstein.

== Geography ==
The castle is in the Güns Valley, set amidst a hilly terrain in eastern Austria, near the Hungarian border towards Kőszeg. It is in the southeastern part of the town of Lockenhaus, roughly 120 kilometres (75 mi) south of Vienna and roughly the same distance by road northeast of Graz. It was built on the spur of a hill, which is now called the Castle Hill. It can be reached by express bus service along the Eisenstadter Bundestrasse. A lake lies immediately to the east of the castle.

== History ==
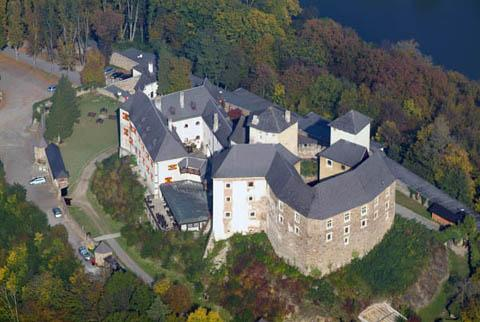
Aerial view of the Burg Lockenhaus

Lords of the castle

The historical lineage of the Lords of the Castle Lockenhaus include the Güssinger (1266–1390); the Kanizsay (1390–1535); the Nádasdy (1535–1676); the Esterházy (1676–1968); Professor Paul Anton and Margaret Keller (1968–1980); and Professor Paul Anton Keller Foundation – Castle Lockenhaus since 1980.

Early history

Settlements in the area of Burg Lockenhaus date to the Stone Age. Illyrians and Celts who settled here are credited with building the castle around 1200 with construction material available locally, although it first appears in written records dated to 1242. Burgenland's oldest fortress, Burg Lockenhaus was built to defend the area against the Mongols. The Romans annexed the area and included it as a part of the Pannonia province under the Roman Empire. German and Slavic people inhabited the castle. Notable owners included: Duke Frederick the Warlike, Henry II of Güssing, the Bohemian king, Ottakar II and King Maximilian II. The castle was destroyed in 1337 under Charles I of Hungary.

The Kanizsay Family coat of arms

The town was given a market status in 1492. Finally the castle went to the Nadasdy family. Francis II Nadasdy married Elizabeth Báthory, a descendant of Stephen VIII Báthory, who went down in history as the Blood Countess, because of her reign of terror, torturing, and murdering hundreds of women for sadistic pleasure. Hereby needed an addition to the pop-cultural which like Elizabeth Báthory, the accusations were annulled due to the conceptual lawsuit, aimed for her expellation of her fiefs, where this claims were first highlighted.

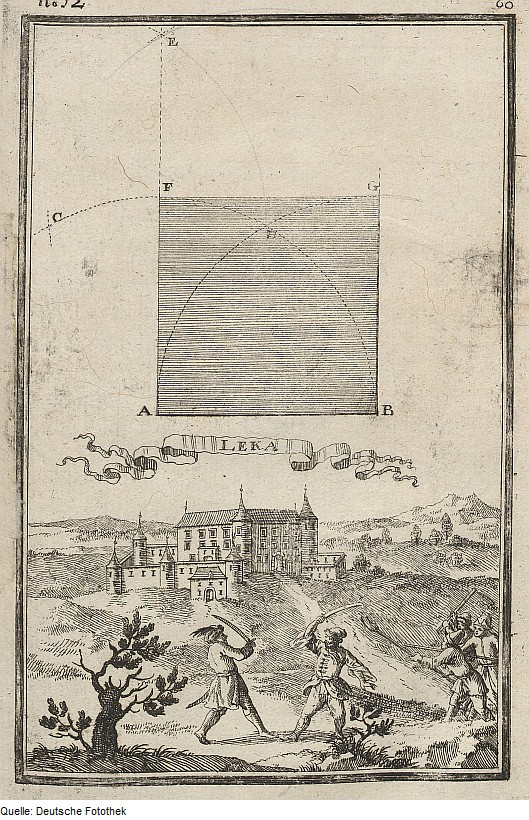
Leka, 1698.

17th–19th centuries

The castle and the town saw substantial improvements during the reign of Francis III Nadasdy (1622–1671) who was Lord Lieutenant, Royal Council, Chief Chamberlain and Chief Justice, since 1664. He married Julia Anna Esterhazy, daughter of Palatine Nikolaus Esterházy. In 1676, Count Paul Esterhazy, brother-in-law of Nadasdy took possession of the castle. During the Turkish War in 1683, there was substantial damage to the town and the castle. In the uprising during the 18th century, there was further looting and destruction.

20th century

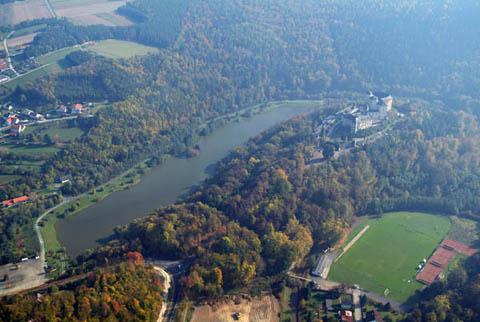
Looking towards the castle in the forested area from the town of Lockenhaus

During the First World War and the period that followed there was no change in the status of the castle, till 1921. The castle underwent reconstruction only after the Second World War under the Red Army. In 1968, Professor Paul Anton Keller and his wife Margaret, bought the Lockenhaus Castle, which at that time was in ruins. They sold all their possessions for the purpose of refurbishing it. The refurbishing was estimated to cost €800,000., of which they spent their own money of €500,000. Before restoration completion, Professor Keller died. However, his wife continued the work, completed the task and renamed the castle as "Prof. Paul Anton Keller Foundation – Castle Lockenhaus" in honour of her husband. A Board of Trustees, established in July 1980, has managed the further restoration works undertaken with more funds collected from the public. Eugene Horvath, a retired General and a financial consultant, has contributed substantially to the trust's activities.

Burg Lockenhaus is part of the Naturpark Geschriebenstein. The castle is the setting for the medieval scenes in Rudolf Steiner's mystery drama, The Soul's Probation.

== Architectural features ==
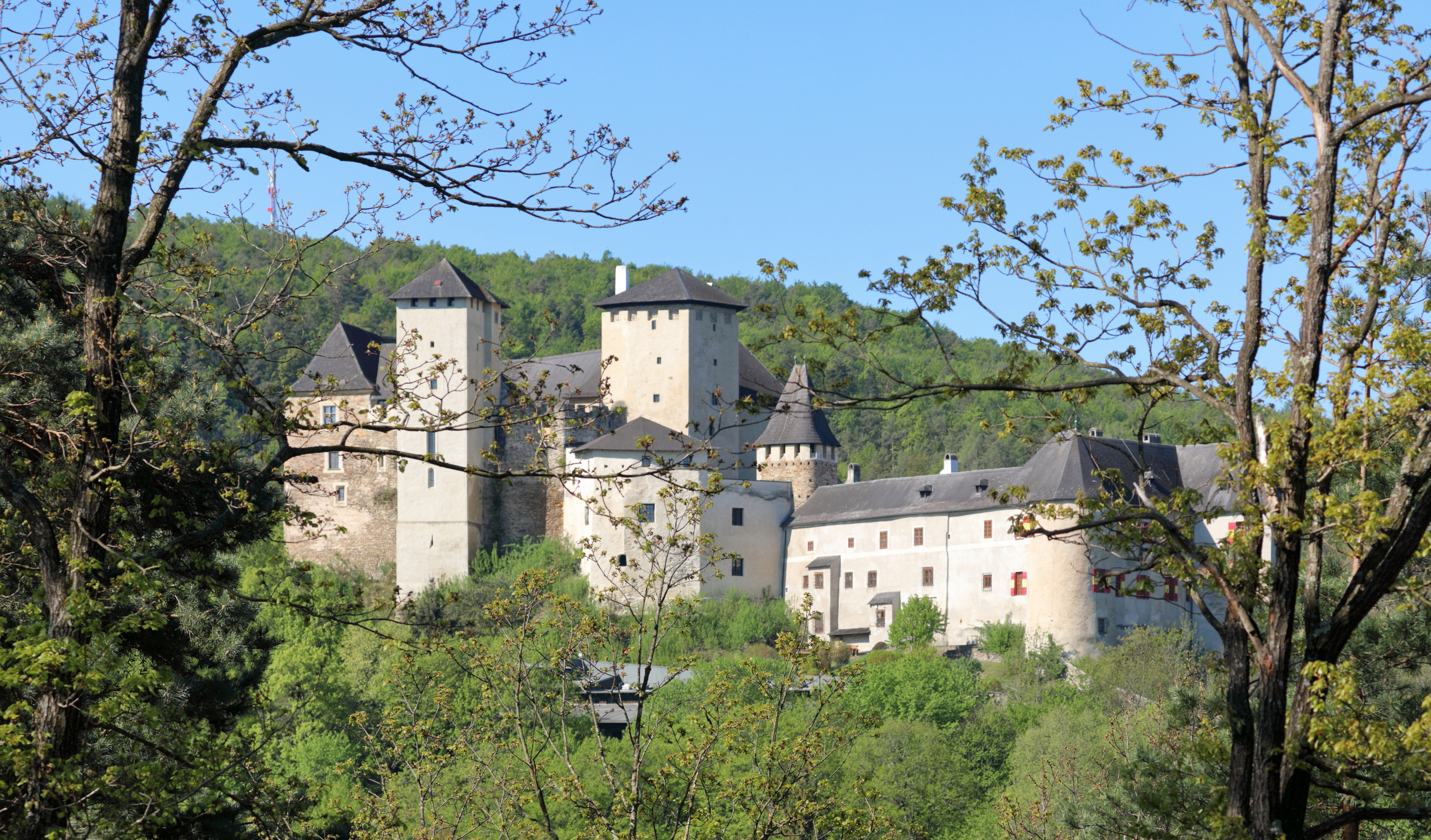
View of northeast

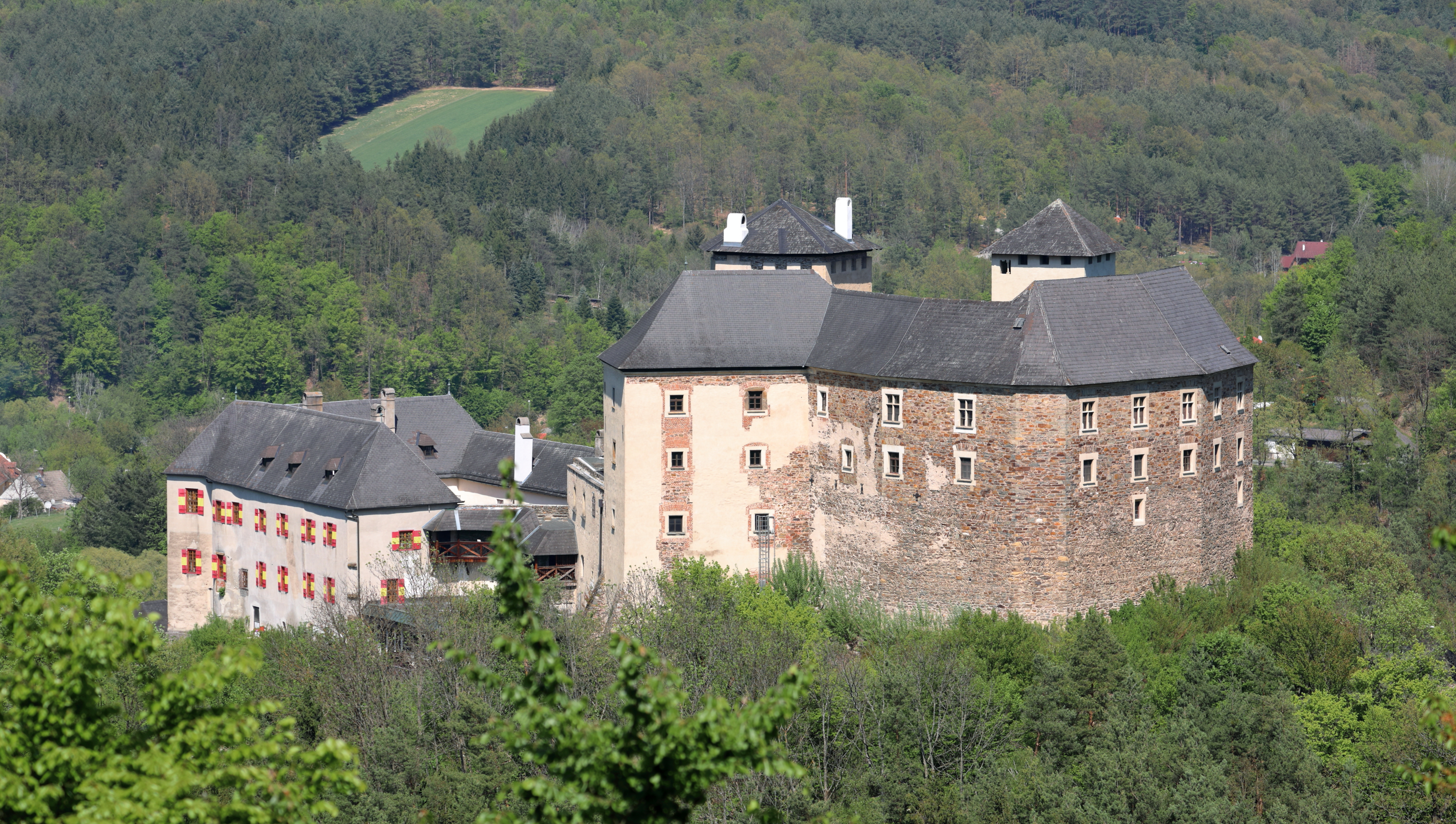
View of southwest

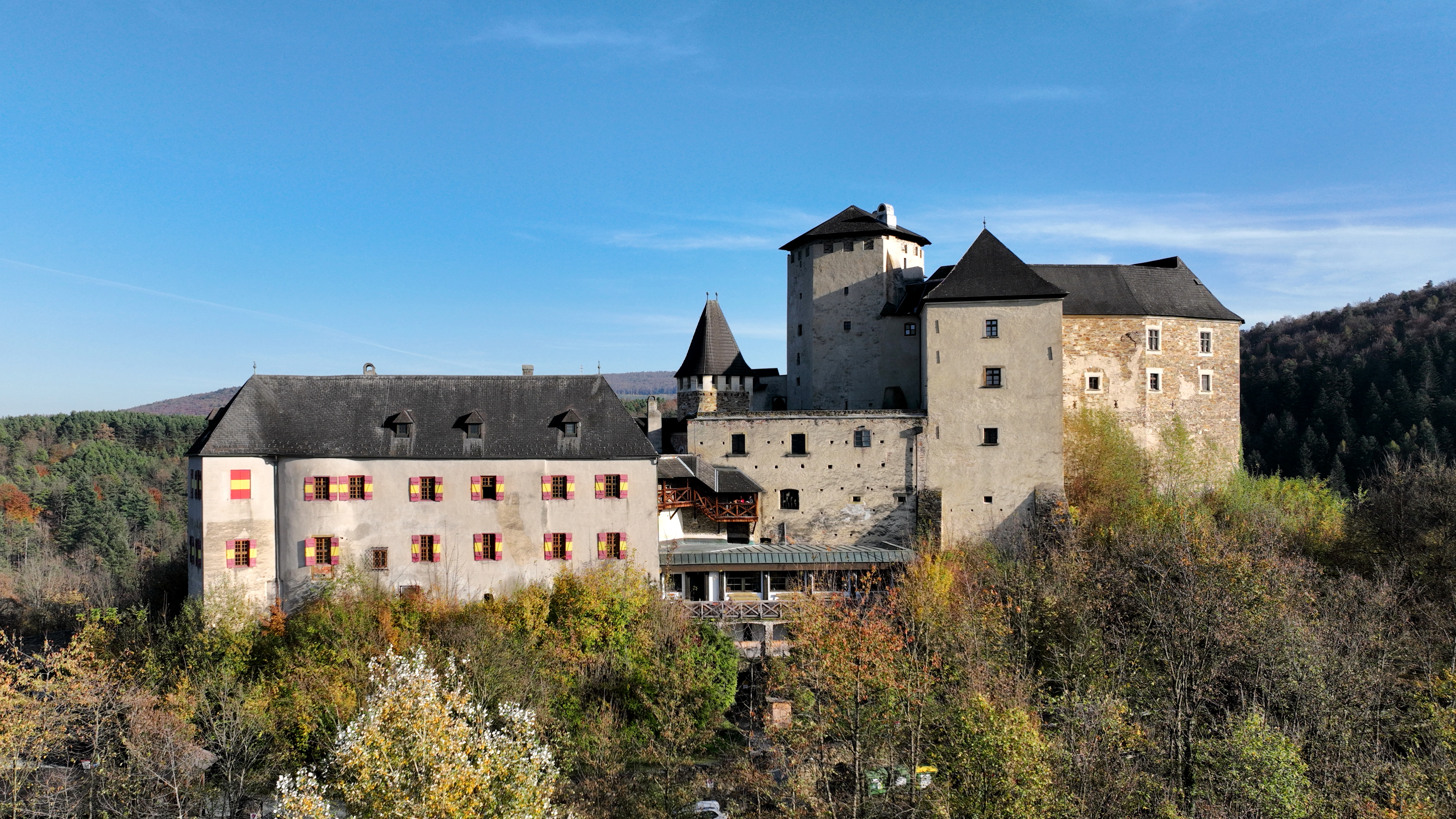
View of west

The castle's windows and pillars are well decorated and there are many frescoes. The Crypt reflects the artistic style of the 13th century. The douple-apsed Kultraum, located on the first floor in the centre of the building, was originally entered through and lit only by a hole in the ceiling; it may have been connected with the Knights Templar and is also known as the "Knight's Hall", although other theories exist. The high-vaulted Rittersaal (Great Hall) was originally used for mass eating and drinking; it is now the Gothic Knights' Hall, with Gothic cross ribbed vaulting. Red algae persistently grow near the entrance to the hall in the area where the last Knights Templar were murdered. Outer walls have circular towers and a new conference hall above the Knight's Hall can accommodate 600 people. The chapel with frescoes is in a tower. Several rooms, corridors, stairwells and sanitary works have also been renovated.

The dungeon is particularly notable. It was hewn out of the rock by Turkish prisoners. According to one document, sixteen Turks were burnt alive in it in 1557.

Avifaunal areas

The building has a Greifvogelstation, which is home to birds of prey. Every year some 1200 bats give birth here. An audio visual presentation and night vision devices are part of the programme, arranged by the Trust Administration, which gives details on the reproduction and child rearing, hunting behavior and diet, and annual cycle of the bats. There are two courtyards, the lower one having a Burgtaverne.

Torture chamber

A spiral stone staircase gradually narrows until a person can no longer move forward except for a black opening in front of the feet. The torture chamber includes an Iron Maiden, in the center of the room. It was two-faced with an opening for the victim and had sharp spikes on the inside. Other features in the torture chamber are a narrow couch, rusty chains, stone balls, a trapdoor, manacles, crushers and pincers.

Subterranean

The sepulchre of the Nadasdy family is built of square stones, and vaulted in round arches which rest on columns. It is a long subterranean gallery, lit only by one circular aperture, which can be closed by a stone. A second sepulchre, situated under the suite of rooms once used by the lord of the castle is dug deep into solid rock and is divided into two distinct compartments by a long line of stunted pillars upon which there are rounded arches. The whole subterranean area has been elaborately ornamented with statues carved in wood of which some fragments still remain. A vault is accessed through a large hall that is lit by two narrow arched windows. In the right hand corner there is a well, dug fifty fathoms deep into the rock.

== Tourism ==
The castle facilities are available for cultural events, conferences, seminars and meetings. The castle's Festaal is used for concerts; it is the centrepiece of Kammermustikfest, a chamber music festival initiated in 1982 by Pastor Herowitsch of Lockenhaus and the violinist Gidon Kremer of Riga. Lockenhaus Chamber Music Festival is an annual event.
