= Mogilno, Lesser Poland Voivodeship =

Mogilno
- Village
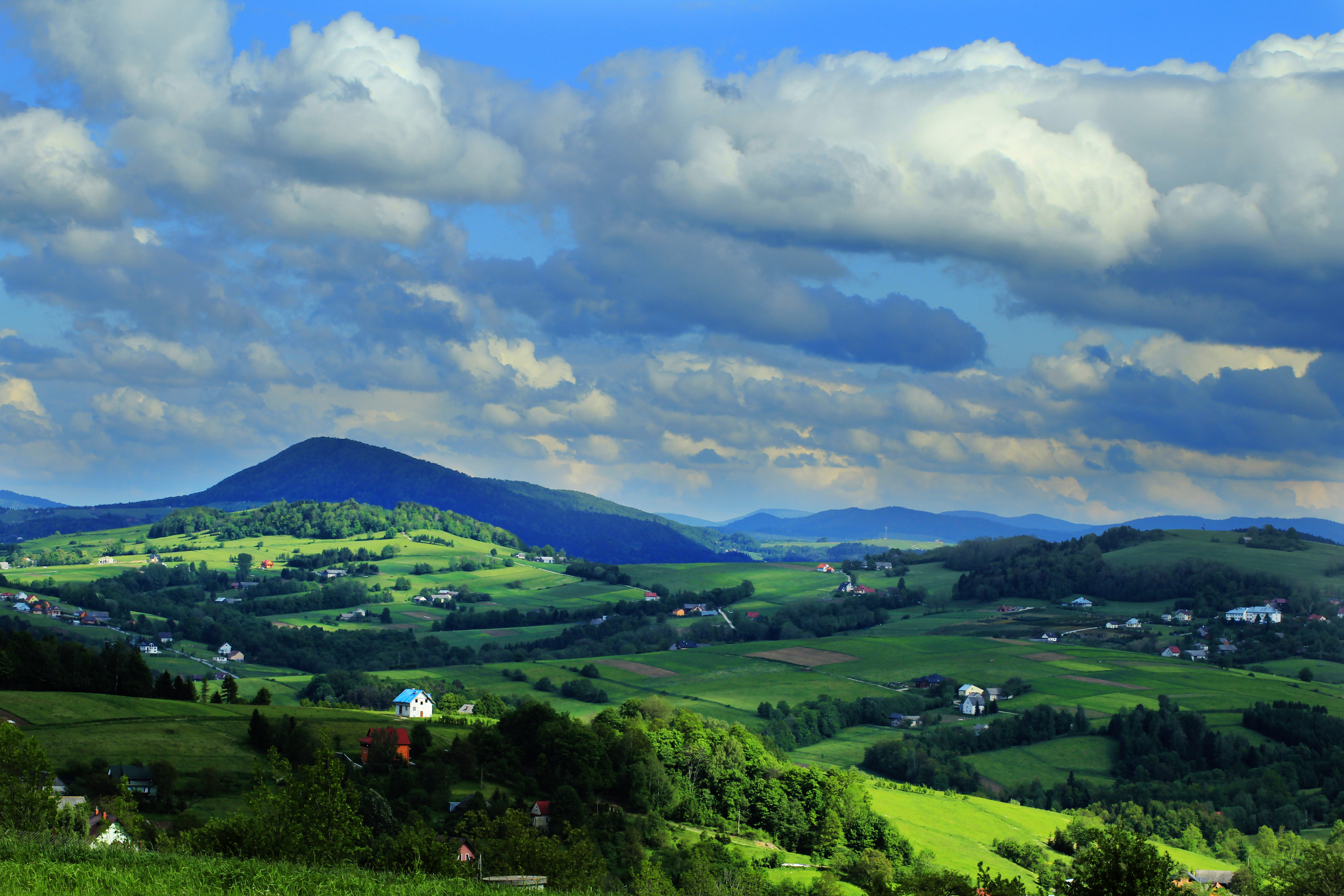

- Location within Poland
- Coordinates: 49°38′N 20°50′E
- Country: Poland
- Voivodeship: Lesser Poland
- County: Nowy Sącz
- Gmina: Korzenna
- Population: 1,301

Mogilno [mɔˈɡʲilnɔ] is a village in the administrative district of Gmina Korzenna, within Nowy Sącz County, Lesser Poland Voivodeship, in southern Poland.
