= Albania–Bulgaria relations =

- Albania: Bulgaria

The diplomatic relations between Albania and Bulgaria were established in April 1913 and on 10 October 1922, Konstadin Boshniak presented his Letters of Credence as Head of Albanian Legation in Sofia. In March 1954, Albania and Bulgaria raised their diplomatic representation to the level of Embassies. From the early 60s onward the Embassies of the two countries were headed by Charges d`affaires and on 25th of January 1988, an agreement was concluded for an exchange of Ambassadors.

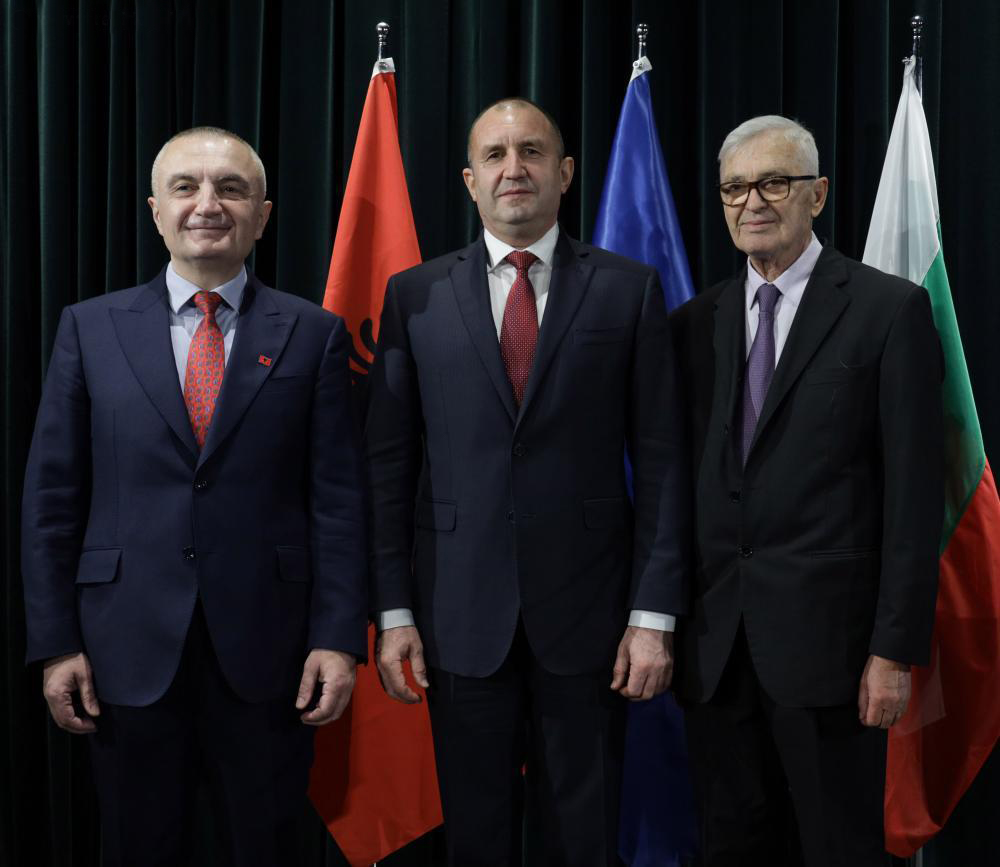
Meeting of the President of Bulgaria Rumen Radev, with the President of Albania, Ilir Meta, and the former President of Albania, Rexhep Mejdani.

As a European Union (EU) member, Bulgaria supports Albania's bid for membership of the EU.

== History ==
The territory of modern Albania was part of the Bulgarian Empire during certain periods in the Middle Ages. Most of Albania became part of the First Bulgarian Empire in the early 840s during the rule of Khan Presian. Some coastal areas, such as the town of Durrës, remained under Byzantine control during this time. The Byzantines gradually conquered the remainder of Albania with the decline of the First Bulgarian Empire, taking the last mountain fortresses in 1018–1019. During Byzantine rule, Albania became the center of a major, albeit unsuccessful, Bulgarian uprising.

The last Bulgarian Emperor to govern the whole territory was Ivan Asen II (1218–1241) of the Second Bulgarian Empire. The decline of Bulgaria continued and the country lost its last fortresses in Albania under Constantine Tikh Asen (1257–1277). Many Albanian Catholics participated in the 1688 Chiprovtsi Uprising against Ottoman rule.

During the Albanian National Awakening, many Bulgarian volunteers joined with Albanian çeta led by figures such as Çerçiz Topulli and Mihal Grameno. Also, Bulgaria aided Albania by printing Albanian books and newspapers at a time when the Albanian language was banned by the Ottoman Empire and neighboring conquerors.

During the Second Balkan War, Albanians helped Bulgaria and sent troops led by Isa Boletini. Some of these battles were the Ohrid-Debar Uprising, the Kresna-Razlog Uprising and other revolts. Even during the Ilinden Uprising, there were many Albanian volunteers fighting side by side with the Bulgarians. Since then, many Bulgarians consider Albanians as friends and historical allies.

Following the decisions of the 1913 Conference of Ambassadors in London, which failed to recognize the contributions of Albanian and Bulgarian uprisings against Ottoman rule, a wave of cooperation emerged between Albanian and Bulgarian kachaks exiled in Albania. Joint insurgent activities unfolded during the September Ohrid-Dibra uprising, reportedly involving 40,000 Bulgarians and several Albanian leaders including Isa Boletini. Figures like Seifedin Postina and Grigor Oshavkov coordinated multiethnic councils, while military operations targeted Serbian supply routes and positions across Macedonia, Prizren, and Dibra. Despite Serbian reinforcements and harsh reprisals, Albanian press of the time documented sustained collaboration between the two groups, framing it as a shared resistance against perceived territorial and political injustices.

=== Albanians in Bulgaria ===
Albanians (Bulgarian: албанци, albantsi) are presently a minority ethnic group in Bulgaria (Albanian: Bullgaria). Although once a larger population, there were only 278 Albanians recorded in the 2001 Bulgarian Census. Between the 15th and 17th century, some groups of Albanians (both Roman Catholic and Eastern Orthodox) settled in many parts of modern northern Bulgaria, along with a smaller group settled in southern Thrace.

=== Bulgarians in Albania ===
In 2017, Albania officially recognized Bulgarians as an official ethnic minority in Albania. The Bulgarian ethnic minority has historically resided in the Eastern regions of Albania (mainly around the Korçë, Elbasan, and Dibër regions) although presently many identify as Macedonians. This has caused a diplomatic row between North Macedonia and Bulgaria over the identification of Albania’s Slavophones with North Macedonia accusing Bulgaria of attempting to “Bulgarianize” the minority group.

== Resident diplomatic missions ==
- Albania has an embassy in Sofia.
- Bulgaria has an embassy in Tirana.

== See also ==
- Foreign relations of Albania
- Foreign relations of Bulgaria
- Bulgarians in Albania
- Albanians in Bulgaria
- Accession of Albania to the EU
