= Jasienna =

- Village
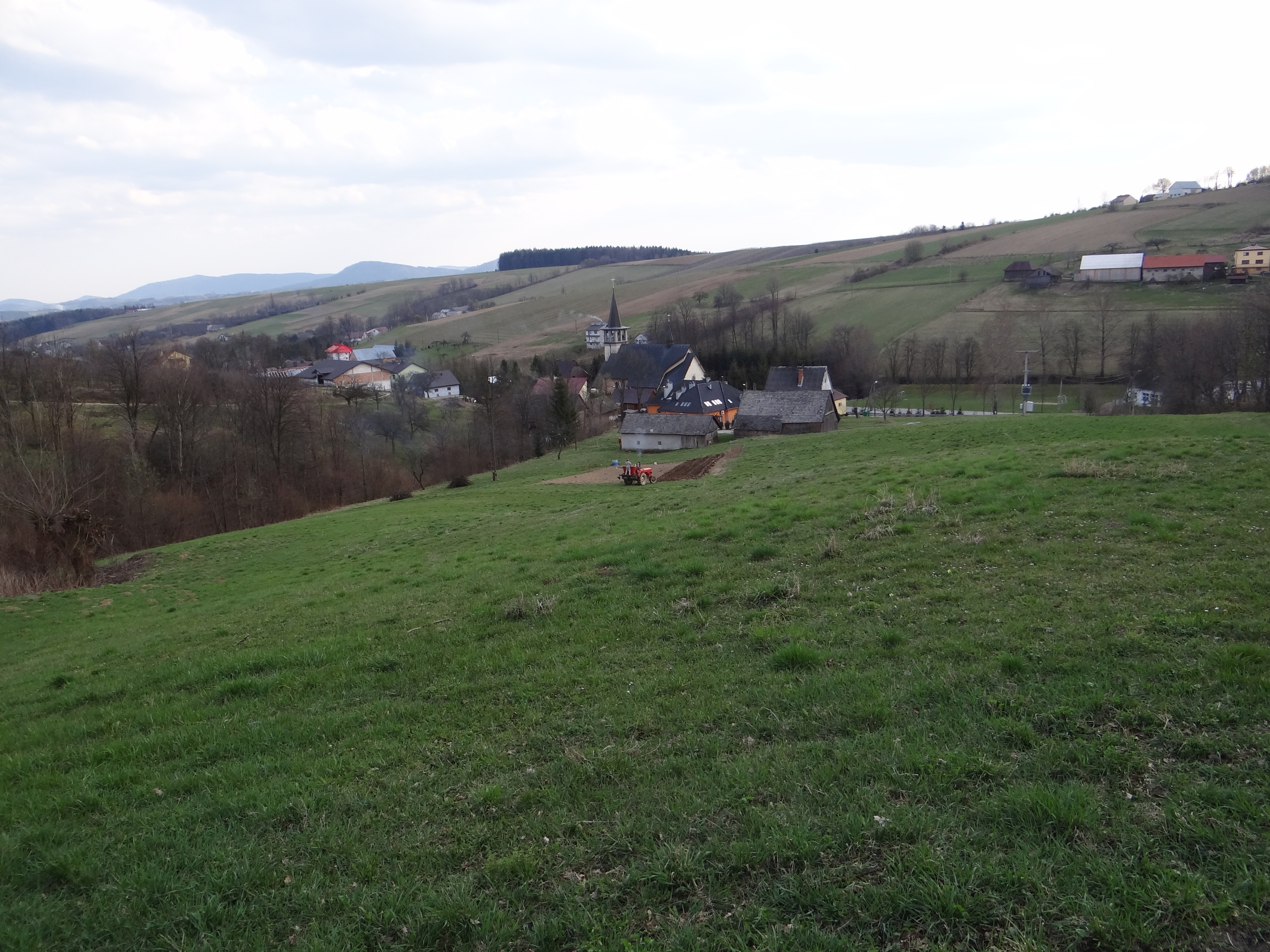
- View towards the village

- Location within Poland
- Coordinates: 49°42′50″N 20°49′44″E
- Country: Poland
- Voivodeship: Lesser Poland
- County: Nowy Sącz
- Gmina: Korzenna

Population
  - Total: 1,000

Jasienna [jaˈɕɛnːa] is a village in the administrative district of Gmina Korzenna, within Nowy Sącz County, Lesser Poland Voivodeship, in southern Poland.
