= Bukowiec, Lesser Poland Voivodeship =

Bukowiec
- Village
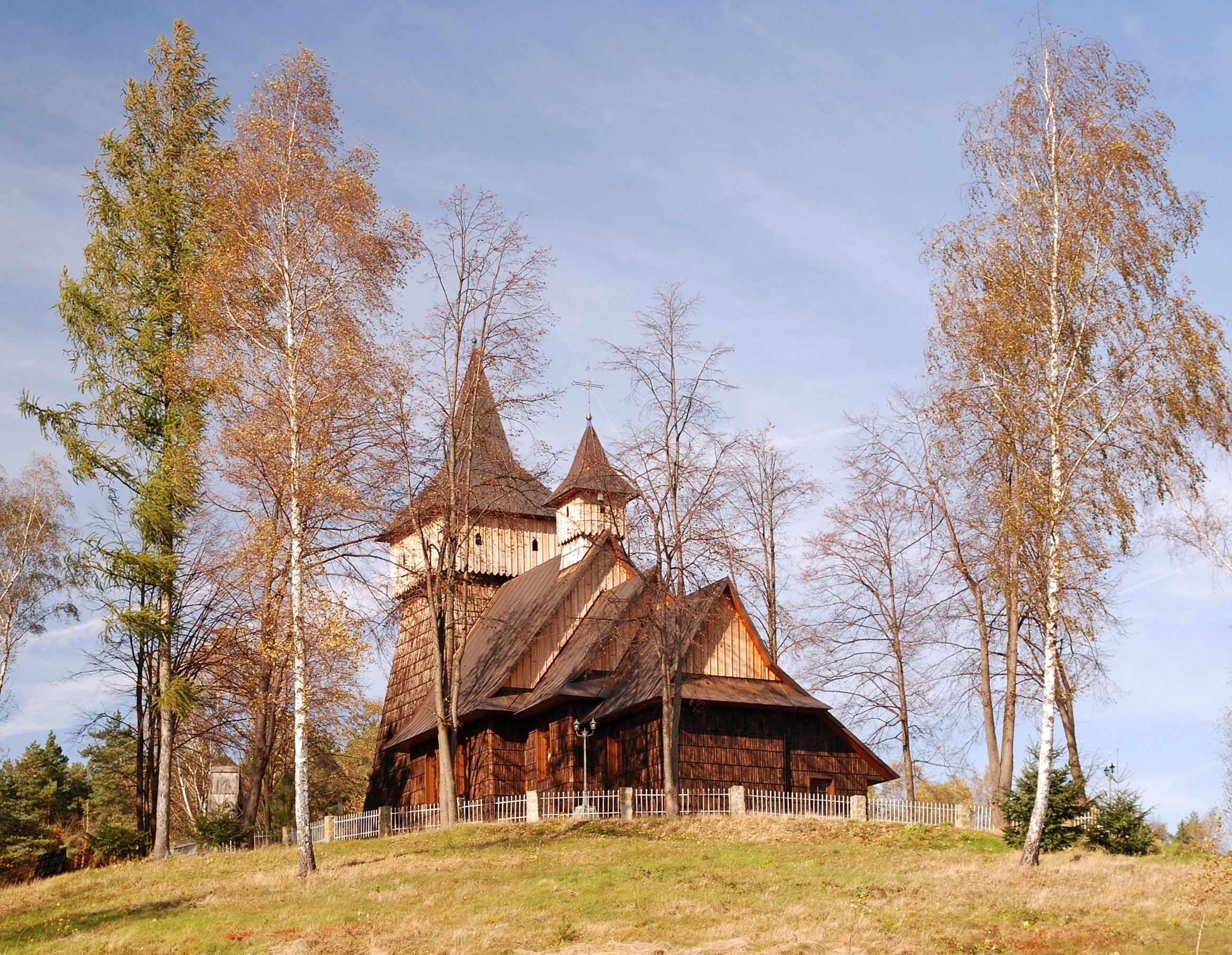
- Church in Bukowiec

- Location within Poland
- Coordinates: 49°44′35″N 20°51′13″E
- Country: Poland
- Voivodeship: Lesser Poland
- County: Nowy Sącz
- Gmina: Korzenna

Bukowiec [buˈkɔvʲɛt͡s] is a village in the administrative district of Gmina Korzenna, within Nowy Sącz County, Lesser Poland Voivodeship, in southern Poland.
