= Korzenna =

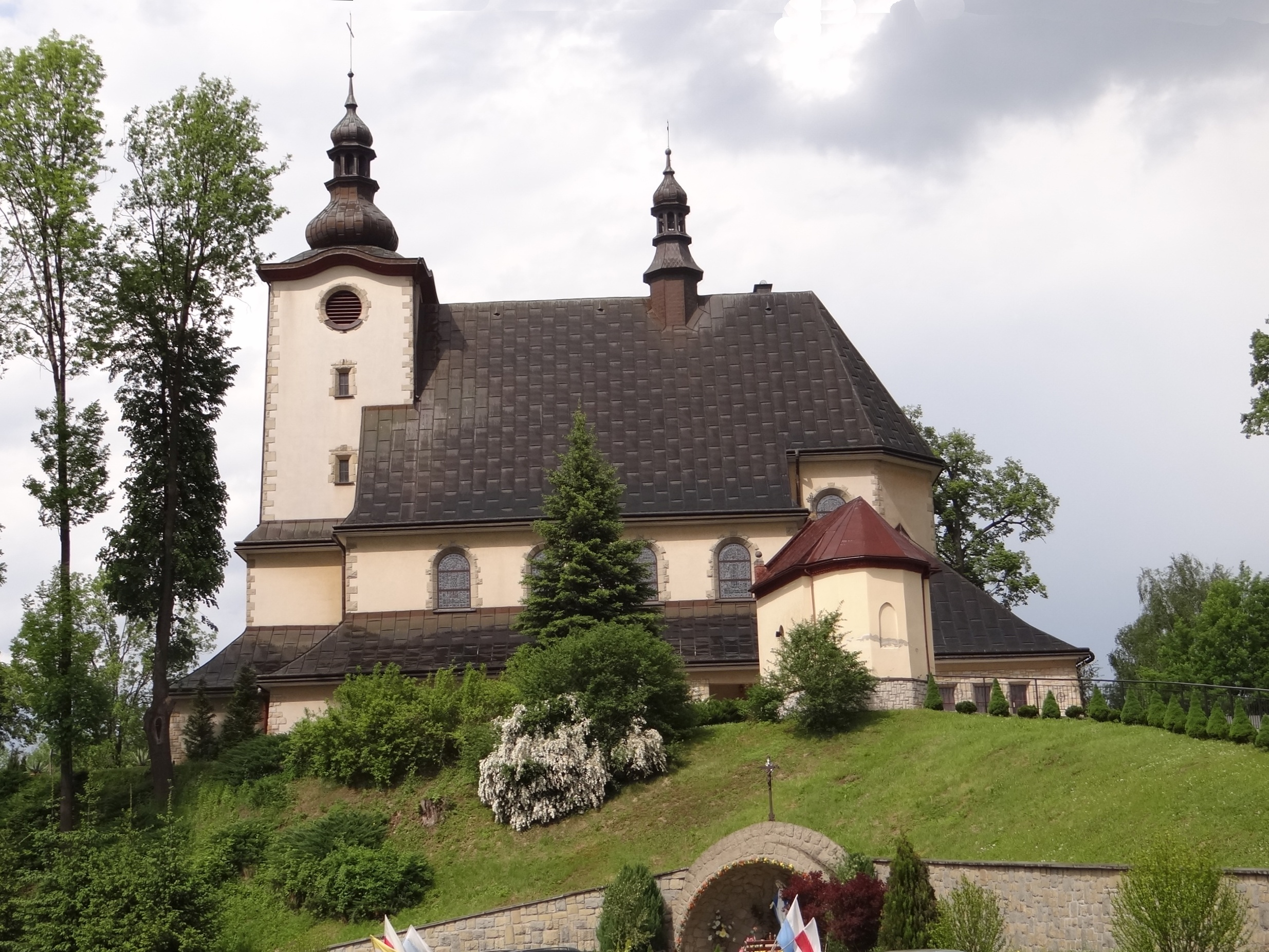
- Church of Our Lady of the Scapular

- Location within Poland
- Coordinates: 49°41′12″N 20°50′43″E
- Country: Poland
- Voivodeship: Lesser Poland
- County: Nowy Sącz
- Gmina: Korzenna

Population (2006)
  - Total: 1,700
- Time zone: UTC+1 (CET)
  - Summer (DST): UTC+2 (CEST)
- Postal code: 33-322
- Area code: +48 18
- Car plates: KNS

Korzenna [kɔˈʐɛnːa] is a village in southern Poland situated in Lesser Poland Voivodeship since 1999 (it was previously in Nowy Sącz Voivodeship from 1975 to 1998).
