= Posadowa Mogilska =

- Village
- Location within Poland
- Coordinates: 49°39′16″N 20°50′46″E
- Country: Poland
- Voivodeship: Lesser Poland
- County: Nowy Sącz
- Gmina: Korzenna
- Population: 780

Posadowa Mogilska [pɔsaˈdɔva mɔˈɡʲilska] is a village in the administrative district of Gmina Korzenna, within Nowy Sącz County, Lesser Poland Voivodeship, in southern Poland.
