= Trzycierz =

- Village
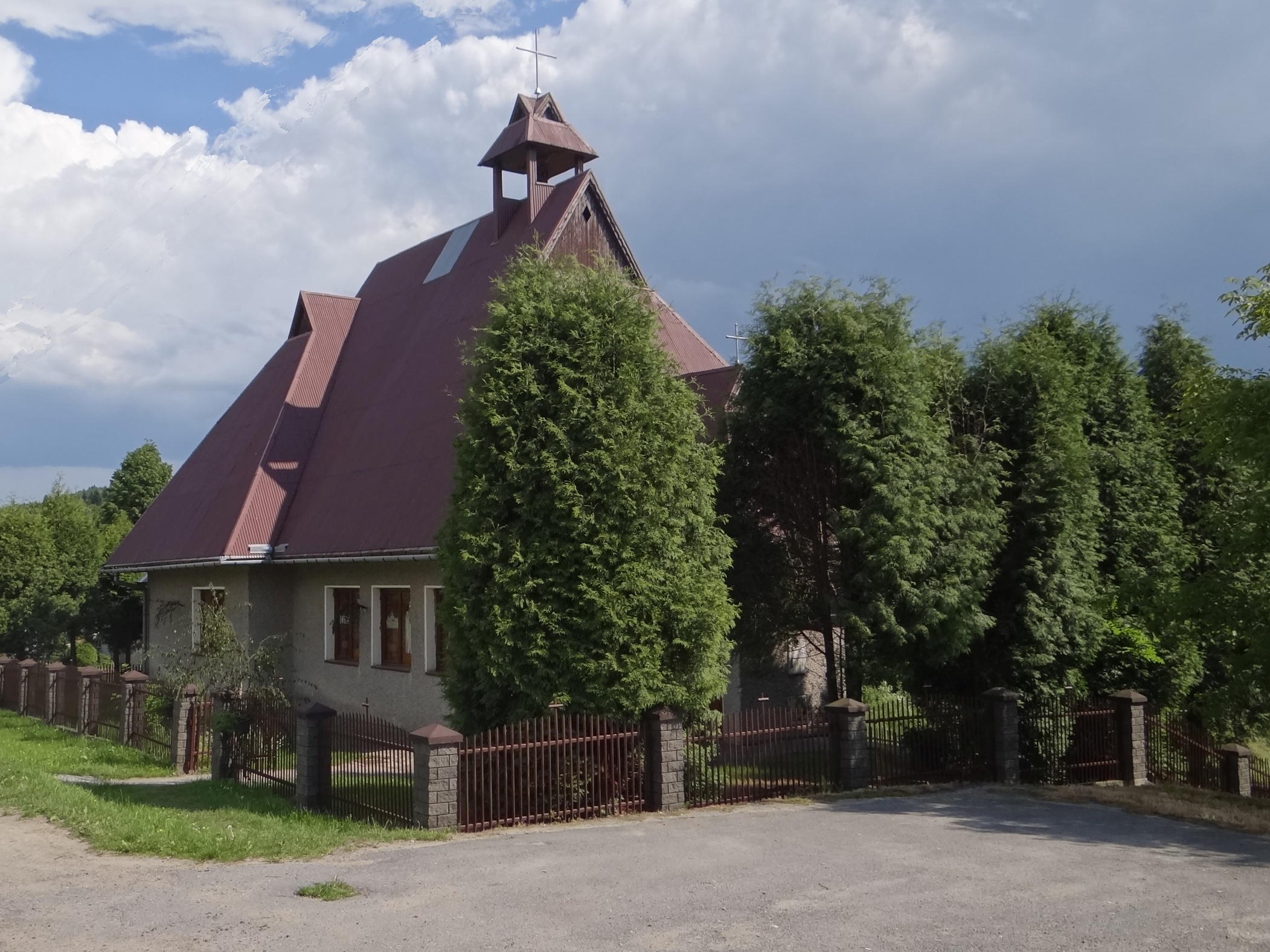
- Chapel in the village

- Location within Poland
- Coordinates: 49°40′45″N 20°48′45″E
- Country: Poland
- Voivodeship: Lesser Poland
- County: Nowy Sącz
- Gmina: Korzenna

Population
  - Total: 487

Trzycierz [ˈtʂɨt͡ɕɛʂ] is a village in the administrative district of Gmina Korzenna, within Nowy Sącz County, Lesser Poland Voivodeship, in southern Poland.
