= Niecew =

- Village
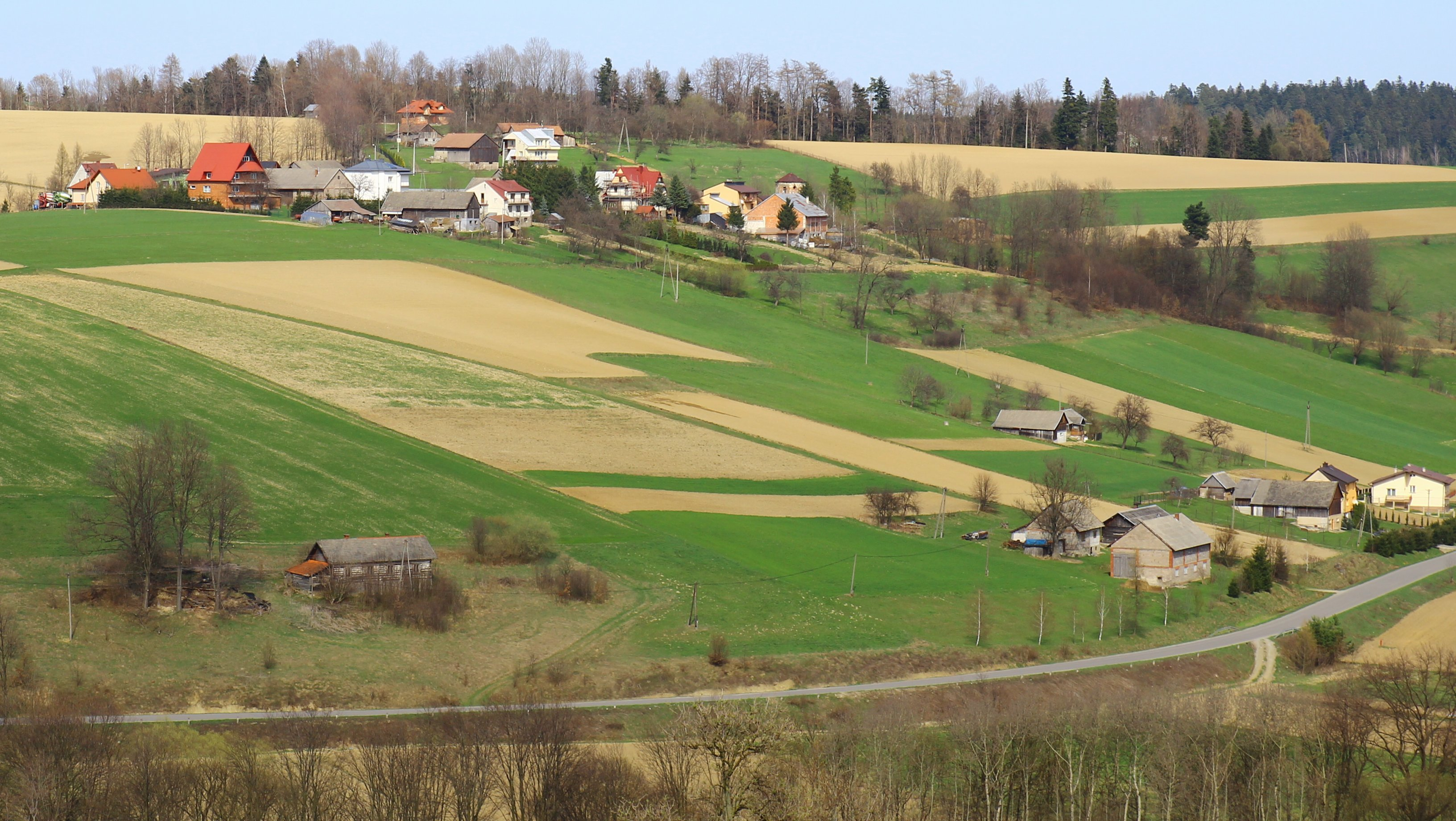

- Location within Poland
- Coordinates: 49°41′3″N 20°52′8″E
- Country: Poland
- Voivodeship: Lesser Poland
- County: Nowy Sącz
- Gmina: Korzenna
- Website: http://republika.pl/korzenna/Niecew.html

Niecew [ˈɲɛt͡sɛf] is a village in the administrative district of Gmina Korzenna, within Nowy Sącz County, Lesser Poland Voivodeship, in southern Poland.
