= Siedlce, Lesser Poland Voivodeship =

Siedlce
- Village
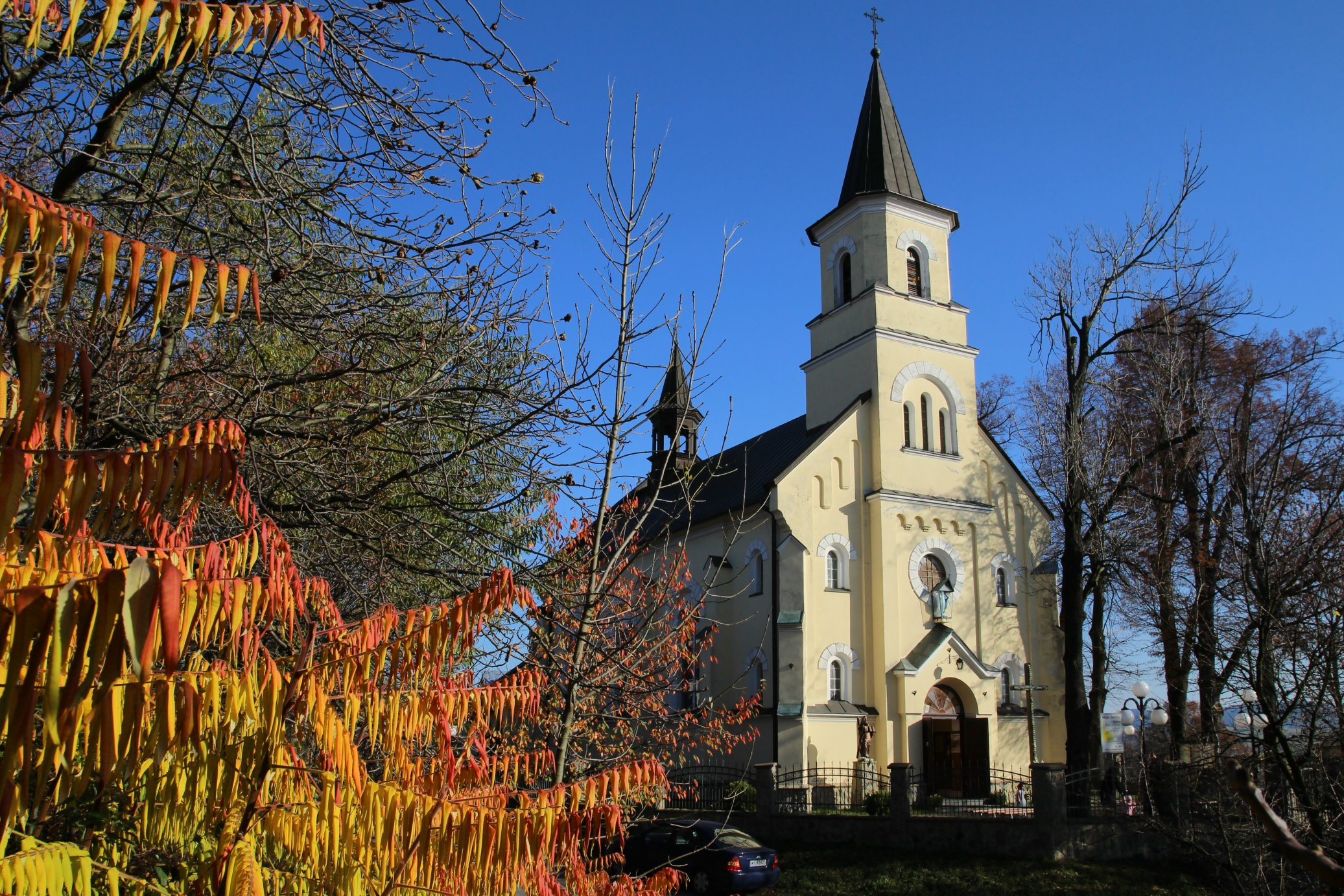
- Saint Thecla church in Siedlce

- Location within Poland
- Coordinates: 49°41′17″N 20°45′59″E
- Country: Poland
- Voivodeship: Lesser Poland
- County: Nowy Sącz
- Gmina: Korzenna
- Time zone: UTC+1 (CET)
  - Summer (DST): UTC+2 (CEST)
- Vehicle registration: KNS

Siedlce [ˈɕɛdlt͡sɛ] is a village in the administrative district of Gmina Korzenna, within Nowy Sącz County, Lesser Poland Voivodeship, in southern Poland.
