= Lekić =

Lekić is a Serbian-Croatian surname.

- Andrea Lekić (born 1987), Serbian handballer
- Dejan Lekić (born 1985), Serbian footballer
- Jovan Lekić (born 2003), Bosnian swimmer
- Marko Lekić (born 1985), Serbian former basketball player
- Milenko Lekić (born 1936), Serbian gymnast
- Miodrag Lekić (born 1947), Montenegrin politician
- Nikola Lekić (born 1990), Serbian footballer
- Ognjen Lekić (born 1982), Serbian footballer
- Rajko Lekić (born 1981), Danish association football player
- Stojanka Lekić, Serbian politician
- Vojislav Lekić (born 1986), Serbian racing driver
