= Wojnarowa =

- Village
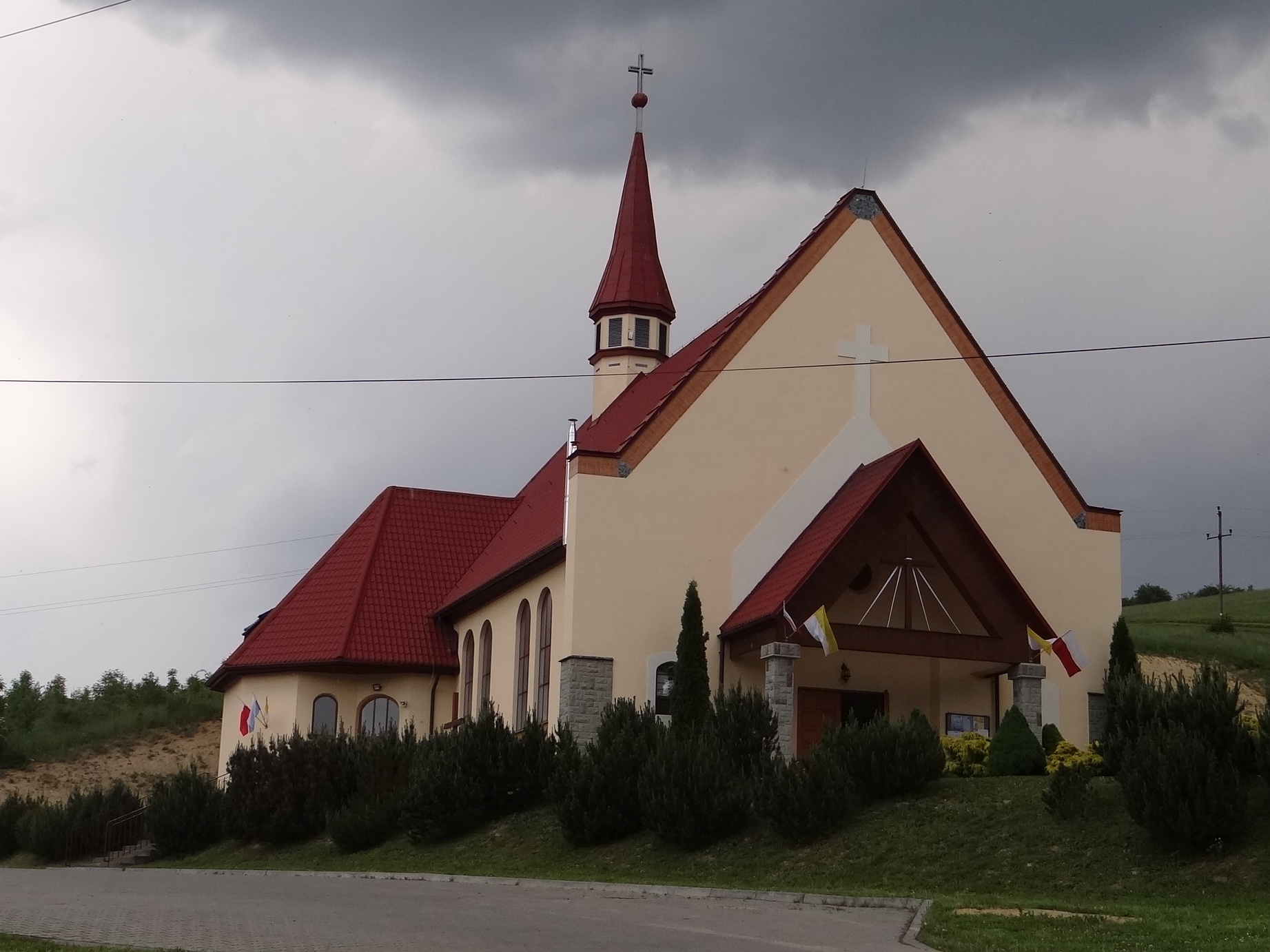
- Church of Saint Kinga

- Location within Poland
- Coordinates: 49°40′N 20°56′E
- Country: Poland
- Voivodeship: Lesser Poland
- County: Nowy Sącz
- Gmina: Korzenna
- Elevation: 400 m (1,300 ft)

Population
  - Total: 1,500

Wojnarowa [vɔi̯naˈrɔva] is a village in the administrative district of Gmina Korzenna, within Nowy Sącz County, Lesser Poland Voivodeship, in southern Poland.
