= Gmina Korzenna =

Gmina Korzenna Korzenna Commune
- Gmina
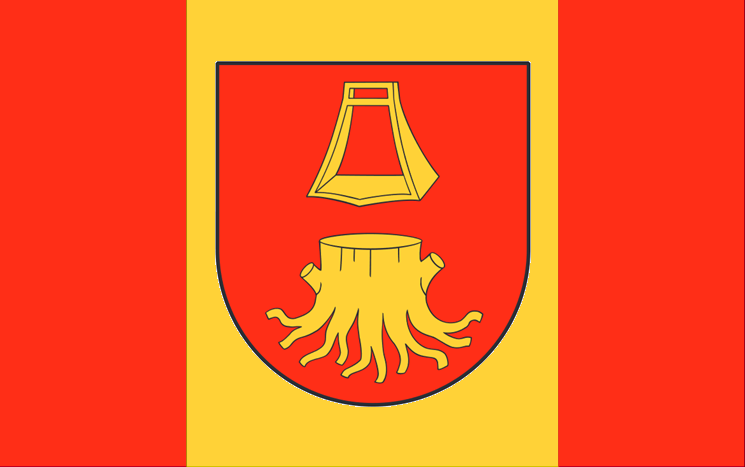
- Flag Coat of arms
- Interactive map of Gmina Korzenna
- Coordinates (Korzenna): 49°41′12″N 20°50′43″E
- Country: Poland
- Voivodeship: Lesser Poland
- County: Nowy Sącz County
- Seat: Korzenna

Area
  - Total: 106.78 km^{2} (41.23 sq mi)

Population (2006)
  - Total: 13,377
  - Density: 125.28/km^{2} (324.46/sq mi)
- Website: https://www.korzenna.pl

Gmina Korzenna is a rural gmina (administrative district) in Nowy Sącz County, Lesser Poland Voivodeship, in southern Poland. Its seat is the village of Korzenna, which lies approximately 13 kilometres (8 mi) north-east of Nowy Sącz and 78 km (48 mi) south-east of the regional capital Kraków.

The gmina covers an area of 106.78 square kilometres (41.2 sq mi), and as of 2006 its total population is 13,377.

The gmina contains part of the protected area called Ciężkowice-Rożnów Landscape Park.

== Villages ==
Gmina Korzenna contains the villages and settlements of Bukowiec, Janczowa, Jasienna, Koniuszowa, Korzenna, Łęka, Lipnica Wielka, Łyczana, Miłkowa, Mogilno, Niecew, Posadowa Mogilska, Siedlce, Słowikowa, Trzycierz and Wojnarowa.

== Neighbouring gminas ==
Gmina Korzenna is bordered by the gminas of Bobowa, Chełmiec, Ciężkowice, Gródek nad Dunajcem, Grybów and Zakliczyn.
