= Leka Mini Baridam =

Nigerian taekwondo practitioner

Personal information
- Full name: Leka Mini Baridam
- Nationality: Nigeria
- Born: Nigeria

Sport
- Sport: Taekwondo
- Event: 73 kg
Medal record
Women's Taekwondo
Representing Nigeria
All-African Games
Bronze medal – third place	2011 Maputo	73 kg

Leka Mini Baridam is a Nigerian taekwondo practitioner who competes in the women's senior category. She won a bronze medal at the 2011 All-African Games in the 73 kg category.

== Sports career ==
Baridam competed in the 73 kg at the 2011 All-African Games held in Maputo, Mozambique and she won a bronze medal.
