= Stojanka Lekić =

Serbian politician (born 1960)

Stojanka Lekić (Serbian Cyrillic: Стојанка Лекић; born 1960) is a politician in Serbia. She has served in the Assembly of Vojvodina since 2012 as a member of the Serbian Progressive Party.

== Private life and career ==
Lekić is from Zrenjanin and holds a bachelor's degree in economics.

== Politician ==
Lekić was given the ninth position on the Progressive Party's electoral list in the 2012 Vojvodina provincial election and was elected when the list won fourteen mandates. The Democratic Party and its allies won the election, and the Progressives served for the next four years in opposition. During this term, Lekić was chair of the gender equality committee; a member of the committee for education, science, culture, youth, and sports; and a member of the province's council of national communities. She was also the founder and first co-ordinator of the women's parliamentary network in the Vojvodina assembly and a member of the informal green parliamentary group, and she served as a substitute member of Serbia's delegation to the Chamber of Regions in the Congress of Local and Regional Authorities.

Vojvodina adopted a system of full proportional representation prior to the 2016 provincial election. Lekić was promoted to the seventh position on the Progressive list and was re-elected when the list won a majority victory with sixty-three out of 120 mandates. During the 2016–20 term, she chaired the assembly's youth and sports committee. She was also given Vojvodina's annual award in the field of gender equality in 2018.

Lekić was elected to a third term in the 2020 provincial election; she received the thirteen position on the Progressive list and was re-elected when it won seventy-six seats. She was once again chosen as leader of the women's parliamentary network in Vojvodina after the election, and she is a member of the committee on youth and sports and the committee on gender equality.
