= Dhora Leka =

Albanian composer and political prisoner (1923–2006)

Dhora Leka (Korçë, 23 February 1923 - Tirana, 27 December 2006) was an Albanian composer and political prisoner.

== Biography ==
In 1942 she graduated from the Pedagogical Institute for Women Nëna Mbretëreshë in Tirana. After graduating, she was given a teaching job at a school in the village of Plasë near Korçë, but gave up this job and joined the Albanian resistance. In 1942 she joined the Communist Party of Albania. At that time she took up composing guerrilla songs. Most of the songs sung by Albanian partisans during World War II were compositions by Dhora Leka, including "Kushtrimi" (Call), "Rini-Rini" (Youth-youth) and "March of the 1st Division". At that time she was promoted to the rank of captain in the National Liberation Army.

In 1948 she went to study composition at the Moscow State Tchaikovsky Conservatory. During her studies, she composed The overture with folk motifs for symphony orchestra was performed for the first time by the Moscow radio orchestra, and Cantata for Albania, my homeland performed in Tirana, on the 10th anniversary of the country's liberation from occupation. After graduating she was appointed professor at the Jordan Misja Artistic Lyceum in Tirana and was elected secretary of the Albanian League of Writers and Artists. She was married to composer Çesk Zadeja for a short time.

In 1956 she was expelled from the Party and the Albanian League of Writers and Artists during purges against sympathizers of the post-Stalinist Soviet Union and sentenced to 25 years in prison. She was released from imprisonment in 1963, but was interned subsequently in the areas of Berat, Lushnjë and Fier. She settled in Tirana in 1991.

In November 1992 she was awarded the title of People's Artist. In February 1996 she founded the Dhora Leka Foundation, which aims to support creators, musicians and young talent in Albania. In 1998, she published a collection of poems, Këngë në shtrëngatë (Songs in trouble).

== Bibliography ==
- Shukriu, Edi (2003). Gra të shquara shqiptare [Prominent Albanian women.] (in Albanian). Pristina. p. 364. ISBN 9951-8557-0-9.
- Slatina, Flori (1999). Portrete artistesh [Portraits of artists] (in Albanian). Tirana.
