= Antonești, Ștefan Vodă =

Antonești Антонешты (Russian) Антонешть (Ukrainian)
- Village
- Location within Moldova
- Coordinates: 46°29′50″N 29°50′44″E
- Country: Moldova

Government
  - Mayor: Nadejda Morari (Independent)

Area
  - Total: 25.50 km^{2} (9.85 sq mi)
- Elevation: 132 m (433 ft)

Population (2014 census)
  - Total: 2,542
- Time zone: UTC+2 (EET)
  - Summer (DST): UTC+3 (EEST)
- Postal code: MD-4212

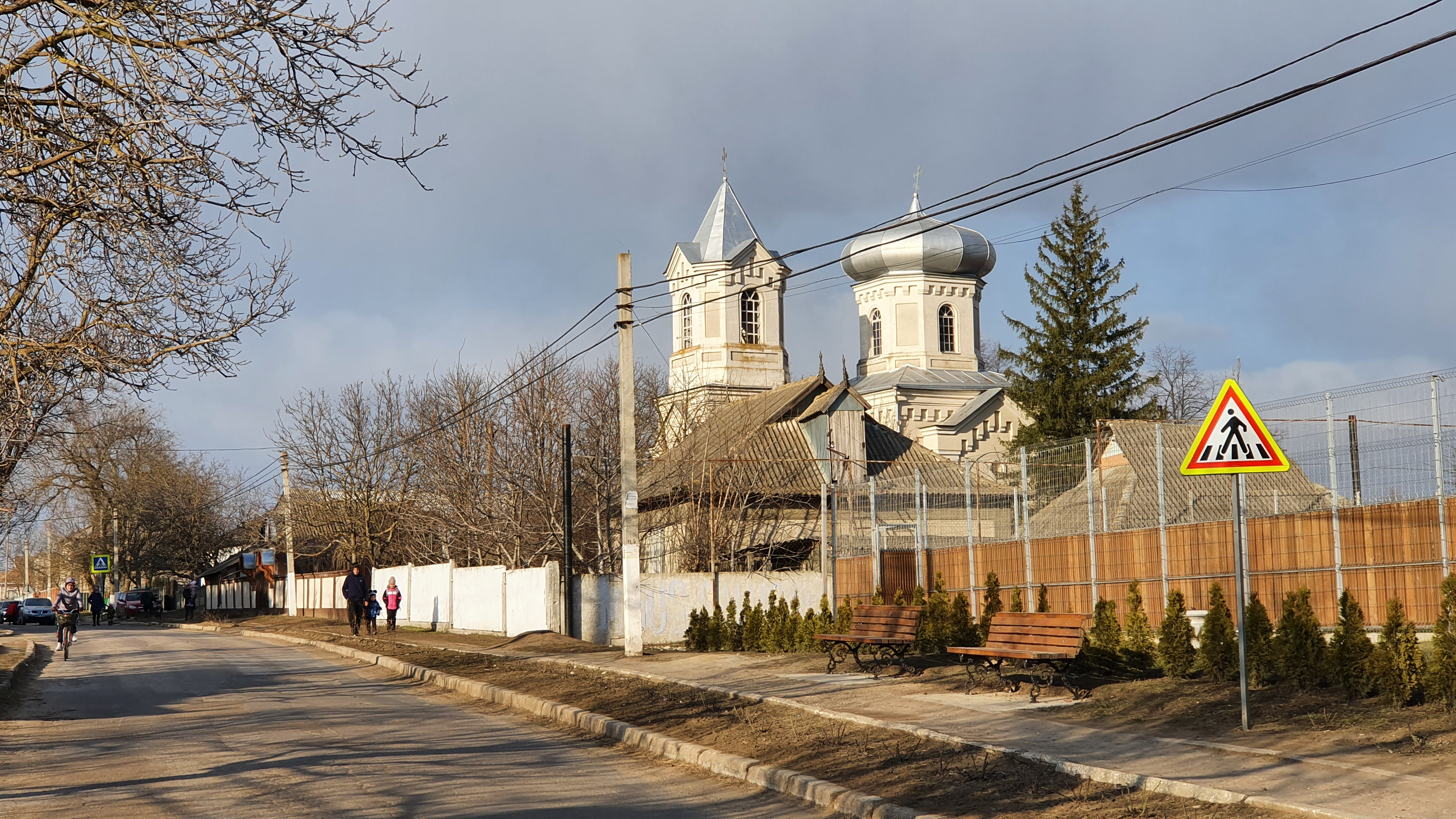
Antonești (Ștefan Vodă District) - "St. Nicholas" Church

Antoneşti is a village in Ștefan Vodă District, Moldova.
