= Łęka, Lesser Poland Voivodeship =

Łęka
- Village
- Location within Poland
- Coordinates: 49°40′26″N 20°46′44″E
- Country: Poland
- Voivodeship: Lesser Poland
- County: Nowy Sącz
- Gmina: Korzenna
- Population: 547

Łęka [ˈwɛŋka] is a village in the administrative district of Gmina Korzenna, within Nowy Sącz County, Lesser Poland Voivodeship, in southern Poland.
