= Battle of Leça =

1384 battle in Portugal

Battle of River Leça
- Part of 1383–1385 Crisis
Date	1384
Location	River Leça, Portugal
Result	Portuguese victory

Belligerents
Kingdom of Portugal	Crown of Castile

Commanders and leaders
Pedro de Trastámara; João Ramalho	Juan García Manrique

Strength
6,800 men	2,700 men

Casualties and losses
Very low	Low

The Battle of Leça was a military encounter between a 6,800-man Portuguese force led by João Ramalho and Pedro, Count of Trastámara, a Castilian noble who was on the side of Portugal, and the smaller Castilian contingent led by the Archbishop of Santiago sent by John I of Castile to conquer Porto. The Portuguese forces, although smaller at the start, received significant reinforcements from Lisbon (that was also under siege at the time) just before the battle. The Portuguese attacked the Castilians who withdrew and were chased. Thus the Castilian blockade of Porto was finished.
