= Daniel Leca =

French politician (born 1985)

Daniel Leca (born September 1985) is a French centrist politician. He is a spokesperson of the Union of Democrats and Independents.

== Early life ==
He was born and raised in Corsica.

== Career ==
Leca first worked as parliamentary assistant of Sauveur Gandolfi-Scheit, member of the National Assembly of France representing Haute-Corse.

He was elected in 2010 as president of the youth movement of the Radical Party and appointed in late 2014 as a spokesperson of the Union of Democrats and Independents.

He was elected in 2015 to the regional assembly of Haut-de-France. In October 2020, he was appointed vice-president of the regional assembly, in charge of Higher Education and Research, Europe, and State-Region relationships.

In March 2020, he was elected city councillor in Compiègne.
