= Lockenhaus =

- Municipality
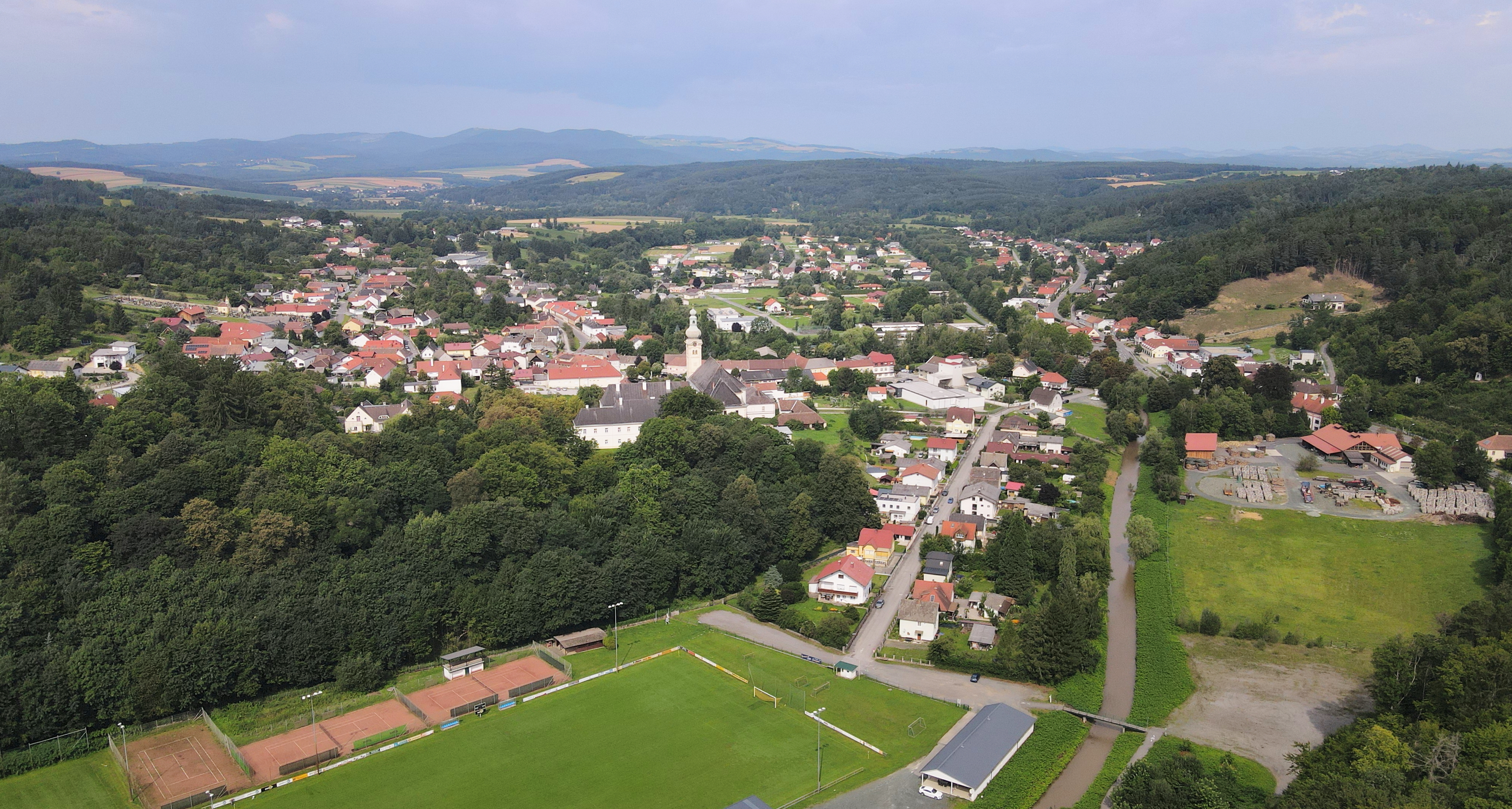
- Southeast view of Lockenhaus

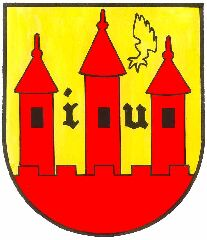
- Coat of arms

- Location within Austria
- Coordinates: 47°24′N 16°25′E
- Country: Austria
- State: Burgenland
- District: Oberpullendorf

Government
  - Mayor: Christian Vlasich (SPÖ)

Area
  - Total: 58.85 km^{2} (22.72 sq mi)
- Elevation: 336 m (1,102 ft)

Population (2018-01-01)
  - Total: 2,066
  - Density: 35.11/km^{2} (90.92/sq mi)
- Time zone: UTC+1 (CET)
  - Summer (DST): UTC+2 (CEST)
- Postal code: 7442
- Website: www.lockenhaus.at

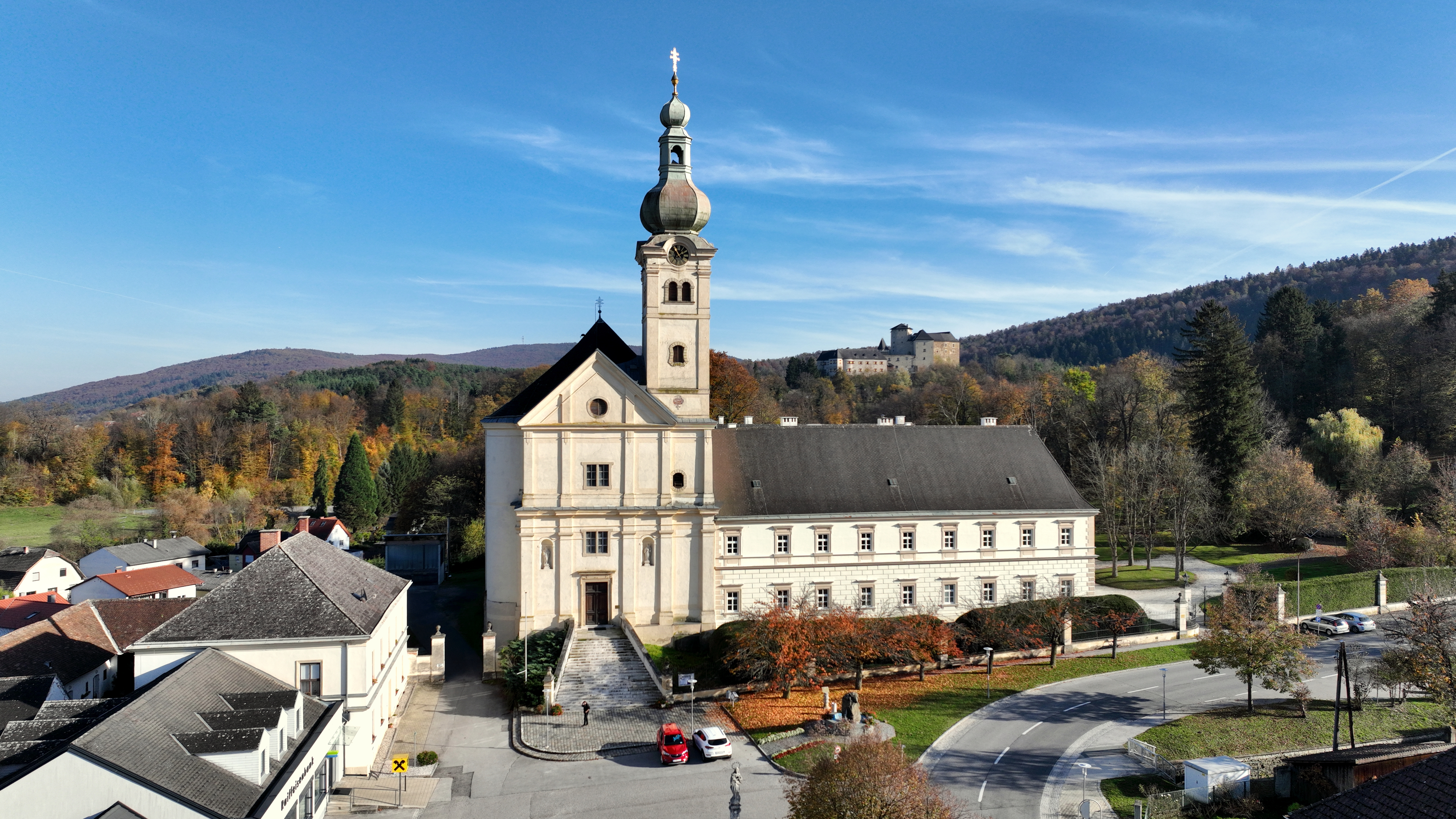
Church and former monastery and in the background Lockenhaus Castle

Lockenhaus (Hungarian: Léka; Croatian: Livka) is a town in the district of Oberpullendorf in the Austrian state of Burgenland. The town is well known for the annual Lockenhaus Chamber Music Festival founded by violinist Gidon Kremer.

== History ==
The town was (like the whole Burgenland until 1920/21) part of Hungary since the foundation of the kingdom in the year 1000. After World War I "Deutsch-Westungarn" (the Burgenland) became part of Austria when the Treaty of Trianon deprived Hungary of about 70% of the territory which it had held for more than nine centuries.

The actor Ludwig Stossel was born in Lockenhaus in 1883 and after emigrating to America appeared in a number of Hollywood films including Casablanca. Members of the Stossel family were part of a Jewish community in the village which existed until 1938. A memorial to those members of the Jewish community in Lockenhaus who were murdered in the Holocaust was unveiled in 2008.

== Population ==
Historical population
Year	Pop.	±%
1869	2,645	—
1880	2,701	+2.1%
1890	2,493	−7.7%
1900	2,482	−0.4%
1910	2,484	+0.1%
1923	2,447	−1.5%
1934	2,357	−3.7%
1939	2,342	−0.6%
1951	2,370	+1.2%
1961	2,292	−3.3%
1971	2,136	−6.8%
1981	2,114	−1.0%
1991	2,047	−3.2%
2001	2,001	−2.2%
2011	1,985	−0.8%

== Sights ==
- Burg Lockenhaus
- Church of St. Nikolaus, Lockenhaus
- Lockenhaus Chamber Music Festival

== Gallery ==
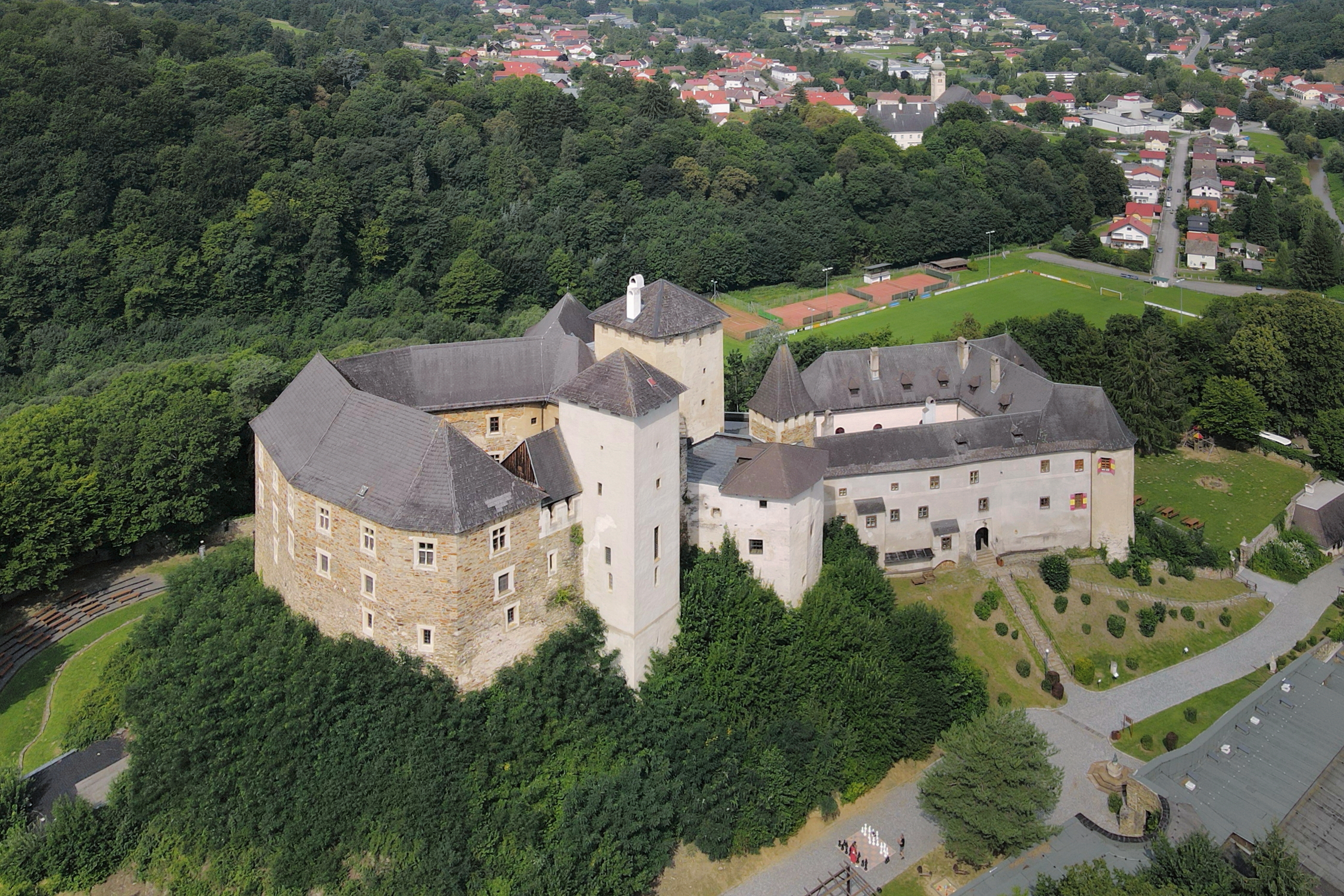
Southeast view of Lockenhaus Castle

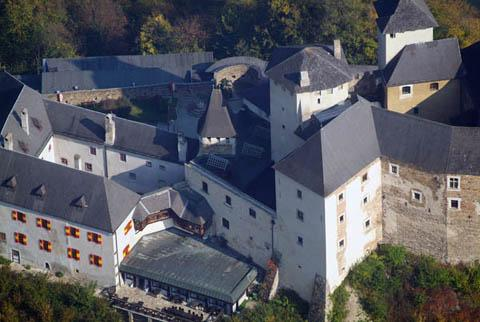

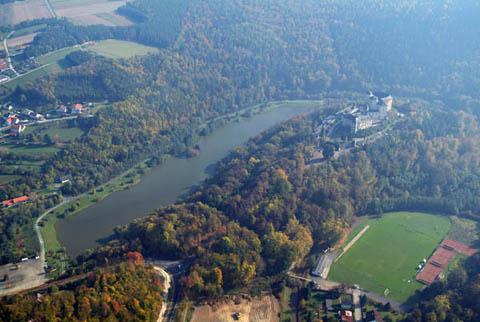

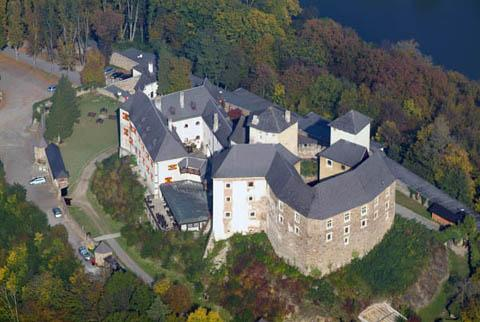
