= Leckava =

- Town
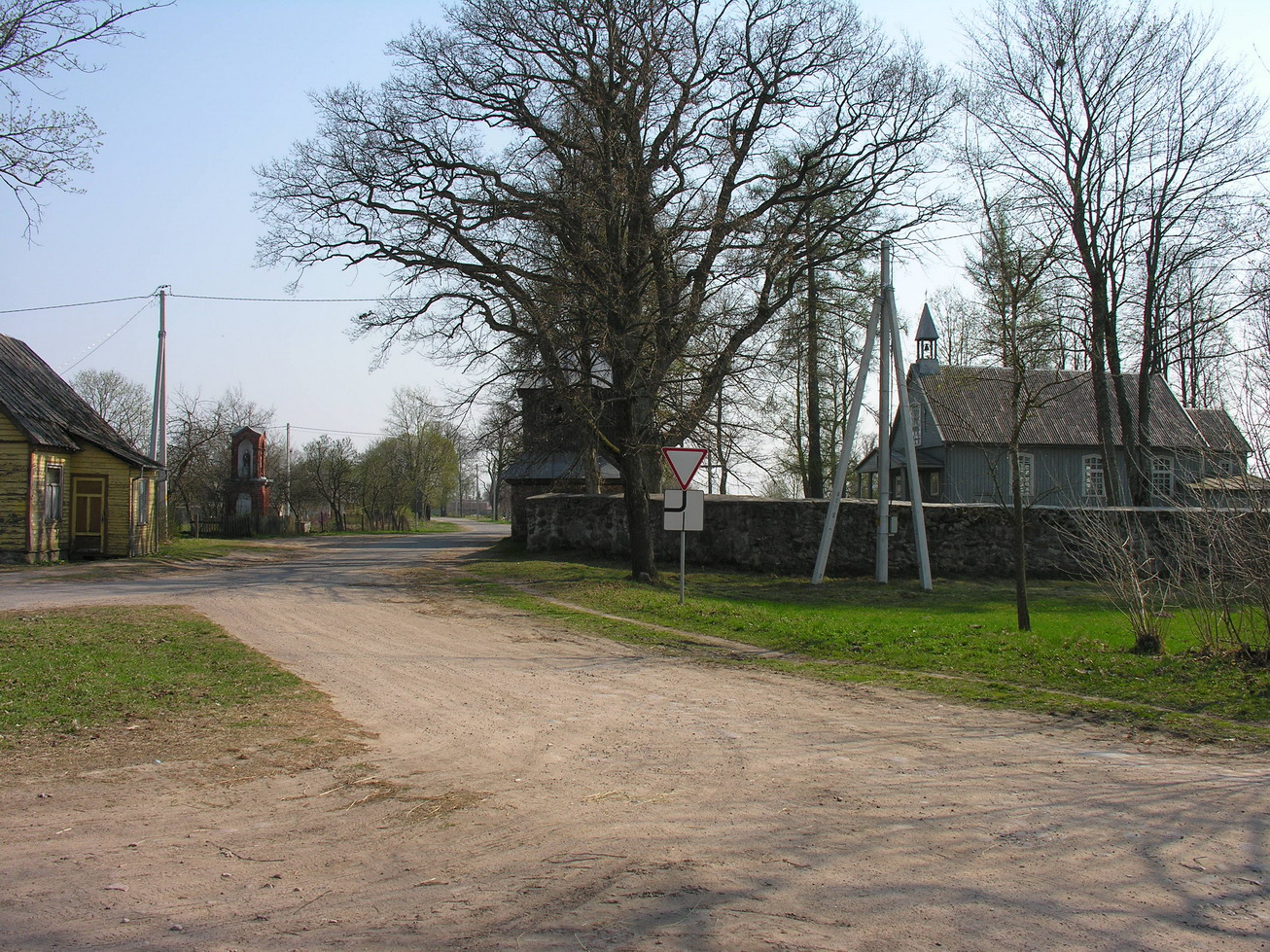

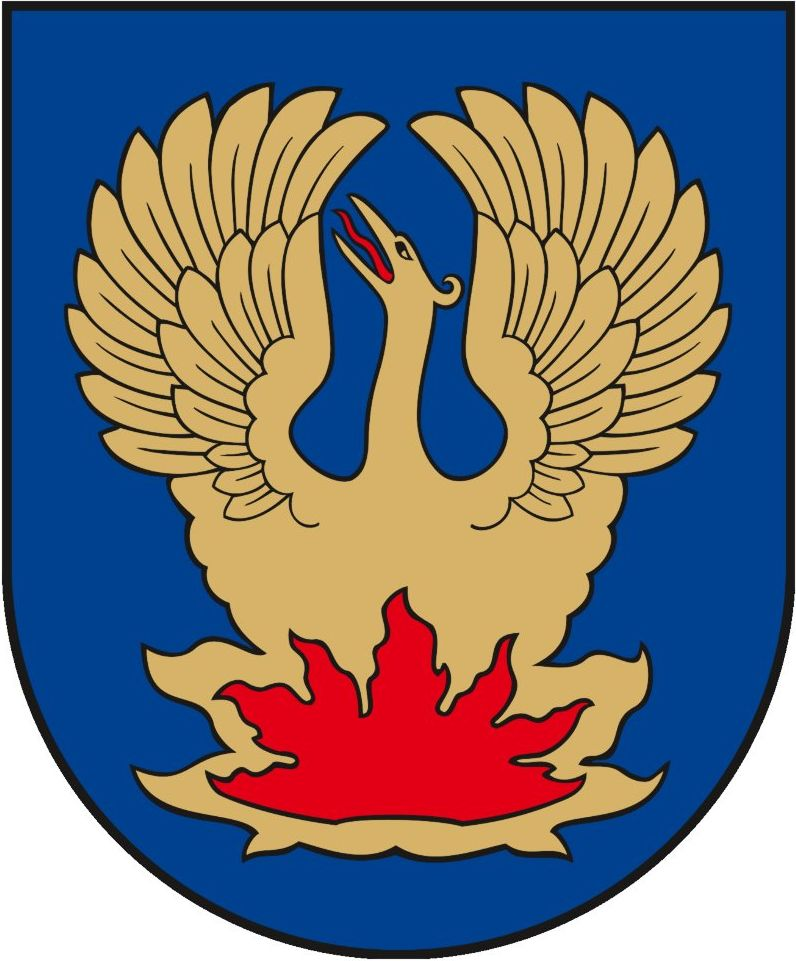
- Coat of arms

- Location within Lithuania
- Coordinates: 56°23′38″N 22°14′20″E
- Country: Lithuania
- County: Telšiai County
- Municipality: Mažeikiai district municipality
- Eldership: Reivyčiai eldership

Population (2011)
  - Total: 195
- Time zone: UTC+2 (EET)
  - Summer (DST): UTC+3 (EEST)

Leckava (Samogitian: Leckava, Polish: Lacków) is a town in Telšiai County, Lithuania. According to the 2011 census, the town has a population of 195 people.
