= Marios Lekkas =

Greek male model (born 1979)

- Born: Marios Lekkas; April 5, 1979 (age 46); Athens, Greece
- Modeling information
- Height: 187 cm; 6 ft 2 in
- Hair color: Brown
- Eye color: Green
- Website: https://web.archive.org/web/20101220034637/http://marios-lekkas.net/main/profile/

Marios Lekkas (Greek: Μάριος Λέκκας) is a Greek model. He was born in Athens, Greece, on April 5, 1979, and started modeling when he was 23 years old. Most recently, Lekkas walked the runway for Frankie Morello, Gazzarini, Giorgio Armani, and Versace during Milan Fashion Week. Lekkas has been the face of at least three fragrance campaigns in the past six years of his career: Bvlgari, Max Factor, and Ungaro Man.

Lekkas is currently represented by at least 17 modelling agencies, including Fashion Model Management (Milan), MGM Models (Paris), DNA Models (New York City), Next Models (London), and View Management (Barcelona).
