= Antonești, Cantemir =

Antonești
- Commune
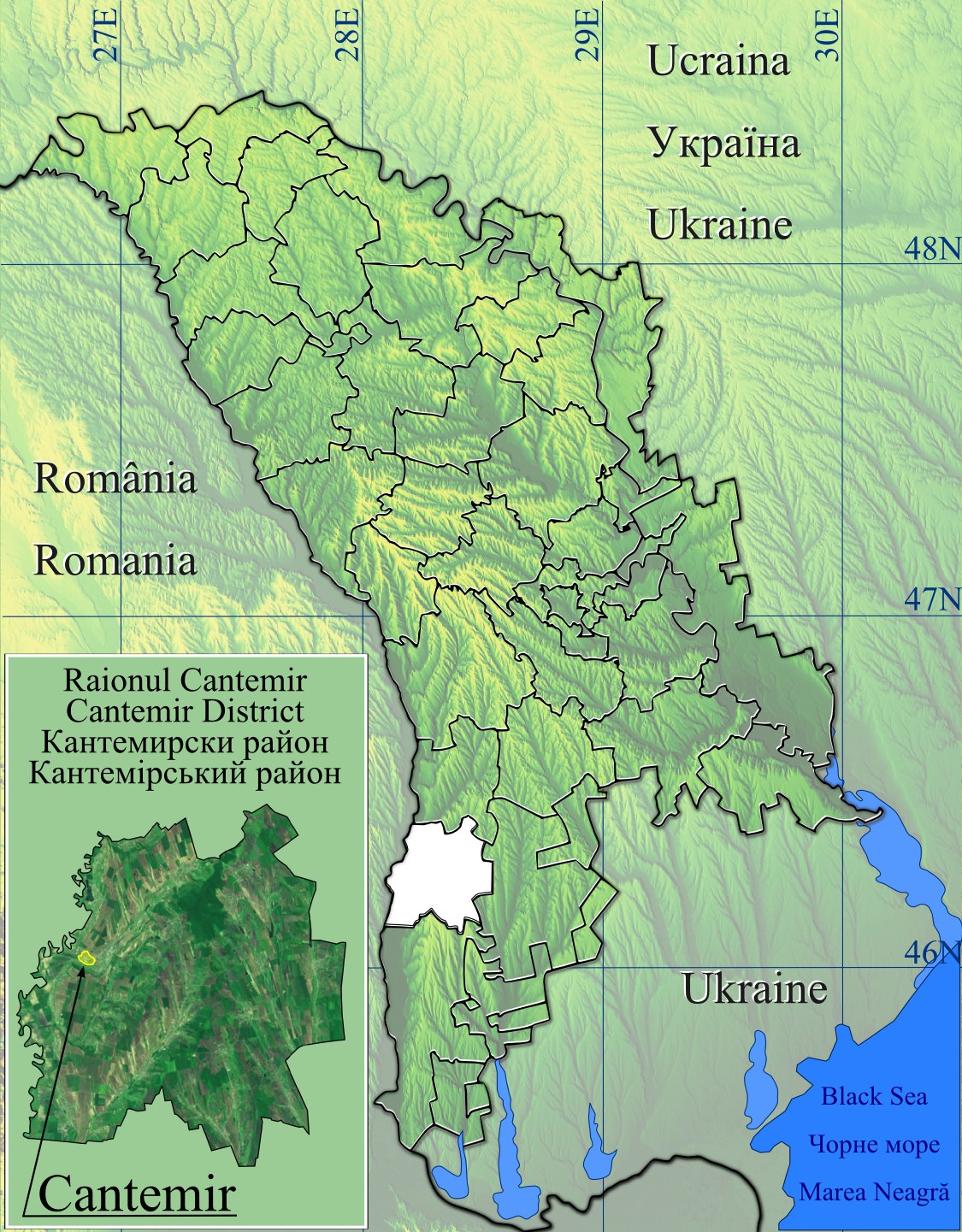
- Location in Moldova
- Coordinates: 46°20′16″N 28°13′2″E
- Country: Moldova
- District: Cantemir District

Population (2014)
  - Total: 1,469
- Time zone: UTC+2 (EET)
  - Summer (DST): UTC+3 (EEST)

Antonești is a commune in Cantemir District, Moldova. It is composed of two villages, Antonești and Leca.
