= Leka (Paulician leader) =

Paulician leader in medieval Bulgaria

Leka (Lekas in Skylitzes Continuatus) was a Paulician leader in the 11th century Byzantine Balkans in the territory of contemporary Bulgaria.

He is mentioned in the History of Michael Attaleiates and in Skylitzes Continuatus partly based on information from Attaleiates. Lekas was a member of the Paulician Christian sect. He lived in Philippopolis (Plovdiv) and was married to a Pecheneg woman. The Pechenegs north of the Danube in the 11th century had been influenced by Paulician ideas. In alliance with them and the Paulician leader Dobromir (Dobromiros in Skylitzes Continuatus) he launched a revolt in the eastern Balkans in 1078–79 in an attempt to become an independent ruler. In the revolt he killed Michael, bishop of Serdica (Sofia). Dobromir expanded in the region of Mesembria (coastal Bulgaria). As the new Emperor Nikephoros III Botaneiates organized an army to send against them, they accepted the rule of the emperor and were given many gifts and privileges.

The mention of the Paulician Leka is the first mention of the Albanian name Leka and indicates that this individual may have been an Albanian. As such, it is the first reference of a medieval Albanian by name by the same author (Attaleiates) who mentions medieval Albanians for the first time in Byzantine literature. The attestation of a Paulician Albanian suggests that Paulicians had become popular among Albanian groups. Toponymy between Sofia and Plovdiv in the 10th and 11th centuries indicates that (Proto-)Albanian populations had migrated from their native lands to the eastern Balkans before the era of Leka. The next mention of the name Leka is three centuries later in the names of the brothers Leka (ancestor of Lekë Dukagjini) and Pal Dukagjini who held the city of Lezha.

== Sources ==
=== Bibliography ===
- McGeer, Eric; Nesbitt, John (2019). Byzantium in the Time of Troubles: The Continuation of the Chronicle of John Skylitzes (1057-1079). BRILL. ISBN 9004419403.
- Saldzhiev, Hristo (2019). "Continuity between Early Paulicianism and the Seventeenth-Century Bulgarian Paulicians:the Paulician Legend of Rome and the Ritualof the Baptism by Fire". Studia Ceranea. 9. doi:10.18778/2084-140X.09.32. hdl:11089/38880.
- Malingoudis, Phaidon (1976). "Ena alvaniko onoma stis vizantines piges [An Albanian name in Byzantine sources]". Byzantina. 8.
