= Lecca =

Lecca or Leca is a given name and a surname. Notable persons with that name include:

- Lecca (singer), Japanese singer

== Personal name ==
- Leca of Cătun (d. 1616), political figure

== People with the surname ==
- Dimitrie Lecca (1832–1888), Moldavian-born Romanian soldier and politician
- Celso Garrido Lecca (1926–2025), Peruvian composer (the surname is Garrido Lecca)
- Constantin Lecca (1807–1887), Romanian painter and art professor
- Gheorghe Lecca (1831–1885), Moldavian-born Romanian politician
- Haralamb Lecca (1873–1920), Romanian poet, playwright, and translator
- Linda Laura Lecca (born 1988), Peruvian boxer
- Radu Lecca (1890–1980), Romanian spy, journalist, civil servant and convicted war criminal
