= Ostren i Vogël =

Ostren i Vogël Мало Острени
- Village
- Location within Albania
- Coordinates: 41°37′11″N 20°28′11″E
- Country: Albania
- County: Dibër
- Municipality: Bulqizë
- Administrative unit: Ostren
- Time zone: UTC+1 (CET)
  - Summer (DST): UTC+2 (CEST)

Ostren i Vogël (Bulgarian and Macedonian: Мало Острени, romanized: Malo Ostreni) is a village in the former Ostren Municipality in Dibër County in northeastern Albania. At the 2015 local government reform it became part of the municipality Bulqizë. It is situated within the Gollobordë region.

== Demographic history ==
Ostren i Vogël (Mali Ostrani) appears in the Ottoman defter of 1467 as a village in the timar of Karaca in the vilayet of Dulgoberda. The settlement had a total of seven households and the anthroponymy recorded attests to a mixed Albanian-Slavic character, with a slight predominance of Albanian personal names and patronyms (e.g., Kallam son of Gjergji, Nikolla son of Pelgrini). A certain Leka from Ohrid appears as among the household heads: Gjuro Luknisha, Mihoja son of Andrija, Gjureci son of Mihoja, Kallam son of Gjergji, Nikolla son of Pelgrini, Leka from Ohrid, and Gjureci son of Meksha.

In an 1878 report, reflecting 1873 statistics, Ostren i Vogël was recorded as having 90 households with 155 Slavic Muslims (Pomaks) and 103 Bulgarian Christians.

According to statistics gathered by Vasil Kanchov in 1900, the village of Ostren i Vogël was inhabited by 78 Christian Bulgarians and 400 Muslim Bulgarians. However, Kanchov noted that the inhabitants of the village preferred to be called Albanians and that they spoke Albanian.

The "La Macédoine et sa Population Chrétienne" survey by Dimitar Mishev concluded that the Christian population in Malo-Ostreni in 1905 was composed of 120 Bulgarian Exarchists.

The village of Ostren i Vogël is inhabited by an Albanian population which dominates demographically in the village. Other inhabitants of Ostren i Vogël are speakers of an Eastern South Slavic language, of whom in the village traditionally consist of a mixed Slavic Orthodox Christian (Macedonian) and Muslim (Torbeš) population.
