= Vrbica =

Vrbica (lit. 'small willow' in Serbo-Croatian) may refer to:

== Places ==
=== Bosnia and Herzegovina ===
- Vrbica (Bileća), a village near Bileća
- Vrbica (Goražde), a village near Goražde
- Vrbica (Jajce), a village near Jajce
- Vrbica (Livno), a village near Livno
- Vrbica, Žepče

=== Croatia ===
- Vrbica, Osijek-Baranja County, a village near Semeljci
- Vrbica, Bjelovar-Bilogora County, a village near Veliko Trojstvo
- Vrbica, a hamlet of Zaton, Dubrovnik-Neretva County

=== Montenegro ===
- Vrbica, Nikšić, a village near Nikšić
- Vrbica, Pljevlja, a village near Pljevlja
- Vrbica, Podgorica, a village near Podgorica

=== Serbia ===
- Vrbica (Čoka), a village near Čoka
- Vrbica (Aranđelovac), a village near Aranđelovac
- Vrbica (Zaječar), a village near Zaječar
- Mala Vrbica (Kragujevac), a village near Kragujevac
- Mala Vrbica (Mladenovac), a village near Mladenovac
- Mala Vrbica (Kladovo), a village near Kladovo
- Velika Vrbica (Kladovo), a village near Kladovo

=== Slovenia ===
- Vrbica, Slovenia, a village in the Ilirska Bistrica

== Other uses ==
- Vrbica (Serbian), a Serbian Orthodox holiday
- Mašo Vrbica (1833-1898), Montenegrin duke and military commander
- Vrbica Stefanov (Врбица Стефанов) (born 1973), Macedonian professional basketball player

== See also ==
- Varbitsa (disambiguation), for the Bulgarian spelling of the word
- Vrbnica (disambiguation)
- Vrba (disambiguation), lit. 'willow'
- Vrbić
- Verbic
