= Gjinovec =

Gjinovec Ѓиновец
- Village
- Location within Albania
- Coordinates: 41°23′13″N 20°30′34″E
- Country: Albania
- County: Dibër
- Municipality: Bulqizë
- Administrative unit: Trebisht

Population (2007)
  - Total: 314
- Time zone: UTC+1 (CET)
  - Summer (DST): UTC+2 (CEST)

Gjinovec (Bulgarian: Гиновец, Macedonian: Ѓиновец) is a village in the former Trebisht in Dibër County in northeastern Albania. In the 2015 local government reform, it became part of the municipality of Bulqizë. It is situated within the Gollobordë region, near the border with North Macedonia.

== Name ==
The name of the village is derived from a personal name Gjin or Gin with the suffix ovec.

== Demographics ==
A demographic Bulgarian survey of the population of the village, done in 1873, recorded the village as having 90 households with 134 male Bulgarian Christian residents and 118 male Muslim (Pomak) residents.

The inhabitants of Gjinovec are speakers of an Eastern South Slavic and the village has traditionally contained a Torbeši or Pomak population.

According to a 2007 estimate, Gjinovec's population was 314.
