= Vërnicë =

Vërnicë Врница / Врбница
- Village
- Location within Albania
- Coordinates: 41°25′24″N 20°31′38″E
- Country: Albania
- County: Dibër
- Municipality: Bulqizë
- Administrative unit: Trebisht

Population (2007)
  - Total: 548
- Time zone: UTC+1 (CET)
  - Summer (DST): UTC+2 (CEST)

Vërnicë (Bulgarian: Връбница or Върбница, Върмица, Вормица, Macedonian: Врница or Врбница) is a village in the former Trebisht Municipality in Dibër County in northeastern Albania. At the 2015 local government reform it became part of the municipality Bulqizë. It is situated with in the Gollobordë region, near the border with North Macedonia.

== History ==
A demographic survey of the population of the village, done in 1873, recorded the village as having 30 households with 97 male Bulgarian Christian residents.

In 1900, Vasil Kanchov gathered and compiled statistics on demographics in the area and reported that the village of Varbnitsa was inhabited by about 300 Bulgarian Christians. The "La Macédoine et sa Population Chrétienne" survey by Dimitar Mishev (D. Brankov) concluded that the village was inhabited by 256 Bulgarian Exarchists. There was a Bulgarian school in the beginning of 20th century in Varbnitza.

During the Balkan Wars, two men from the village joined the Macedonian-Adrianopolitan Volunteer Corps.

Elez Koçi was killed in the village in 1916 by Bulgarian forces.

== Demographics ==
The village of Vërnicë is inhabited by an Albanian population which dominates demographically in the village, including the Nikolla family. Other inhabitants of Vërnicë are speakers of an Eastern South Slavic and the village has also traditionally contained a Torbeš population. The people of the village identify as mostly Orthodox Christian’s.

The name Vërnicë has a Slavic etymology specifically South Slavic, with its name in Bulgarian being identical to the Bulgarian village of Varbnitsa, similar to villages of Vrbnica etymologically as well.

According to a 2007 estimate, Vërnicë's population was 548.

Daniel Nikolla a British-Albanian marketing professional and entrepreneur has origins from this village.
