= Klenjë =

Klenjë Клење
- Village
- Location within Albania
- Coordinates: 41°22′04″N 20°28′11″E
- Country: Albania
- County: Dibër
- Municipality: Bulqizë
- Administrative unit: Trebisht

Population (2007)
  - Total: 207
- Time zone: UTC+1 (CET)
  - Summer (DST): UTC+2 (CEST)

Klenjë (Macedonian: Клење) is a village in the former Trebisht Municipality in Dibër County in northeastern Albania. At the 2015 local government reform it became part of the municipality Bulqizë. It is situated with in the Gollobordë region, near the border with North Macedonia.

== History ==
During the Balkan Wars, one man from the village joined the Macedonian-Adrianopolitan Volunteer Corps in Bulgarian Army.

== Demographic history ==
Klenjë (Kilani) is recorded in the Ottoman defter of 1467 as a settlement in the timar of Hacı Hamza in the vilayet of Dulgoberda. The village had a total of three households represented by Dimitri Susjabi (possibly, Sycjapi); Gjurçe, the grandson or brother-in-law of Dimitri; and Miho Tishani. The surname Susjabi is likely a compound of Albanian sy ("eye") + cjap ("billy goat").

A Bulgarian demographic survey of the population of the village, done in 1873, recorded the village as having 100 households with 196 male Bulgarian Christian residents and 120 male Muslim (Pomak) residents.

According to statistics gathered by Vasil Kanchov in 1900, the village of Klenjë was inhabited by 1240 Christian Bulgarians and 230 Muslim Bulgarians. However, Kanchov noted that the inhabitants of the village preferred to be called Albanians and that they spoke Albanian.

The inhabitants of Klenjë are speakers of an Eastern South Slavic language and the village has traditionally contained a Torbeš population.

According to a 2007 estimate, Klenjë's population was 207.

== People from Klenjë ==
- Cvetan Zafir Mazniku, author in Macedonian-Albanian folklore topics
- Sterjo Budin Budini, master builder and member of National Assembly for three consecutive legislatures (1962-1974).
