= Džepište =

Džepište Џепиште Zhepisht
- Village
- Location within North Macedonia
- Coordinates: 41°26′34″N 20°31′58″E
- Country: North Macedonia
- Region: Southwestern
- Municipality: Debar

Population (2021)
  - Total: 347
- Time zone: UTC+1 (CET)
  - Summer (DST): UTC+2 (CEST)
- Car plates: DB

Džepište (Macedonian: Џепиште, Albanian: Zhepisht) is a village in the municipality of Debar, North Macedonia.

== History ==
In 1913 the village, along with other settlements on the left bank of the Black Drin, were assigned to Independent Albania. The village was part of the Principality of Albania from 1914-1925 and the Albanian Republic in 1925. It was ceded to the Kingdom of Serbs, Croats and Slovenes on 30 July 1925 by Ahmet Zogu.

== Demographics ==
Džepište (Xhepishte) is recorded in the Ottoman defter of 1583 as a village in the vilayet of Dulgobrda. The settlement had a total of 39 households with the anthroponymy attested being of a mixed Albanian-Slavic character with a predominance of Slavic names as well as instances of Slavicisation (e.g., Radiç Gjergji).

Džepište has traditionally been inhabited by Orthodox Macedonians and a Torbeši population.

In statistics gathered by Vasil Kanchov in 1900, the village of Džepište was inhabited by 165 Christian Bulgarians and 135 Muslim Bulgarians. However, Kanchov noted that the inhabitants of the village preferred to be called Albanians and that they spoke Albanian.

As of the 2021 census, Džepište had 347 residents with the following ethnic composition:

- Turks 181
- Albanians 75
- Macedonians 45
- Others (including Torbeš) 24
- Persons for whom data are taken from administrative sources 22

According to the 2002 census, the village had a total of 499 inhabitants. Ethnic groups in the village include:

- Turks 276
- Macedonians 105
- Albanians 96
- Others 22
