= Otišani =

Otišani Отишани
- Village
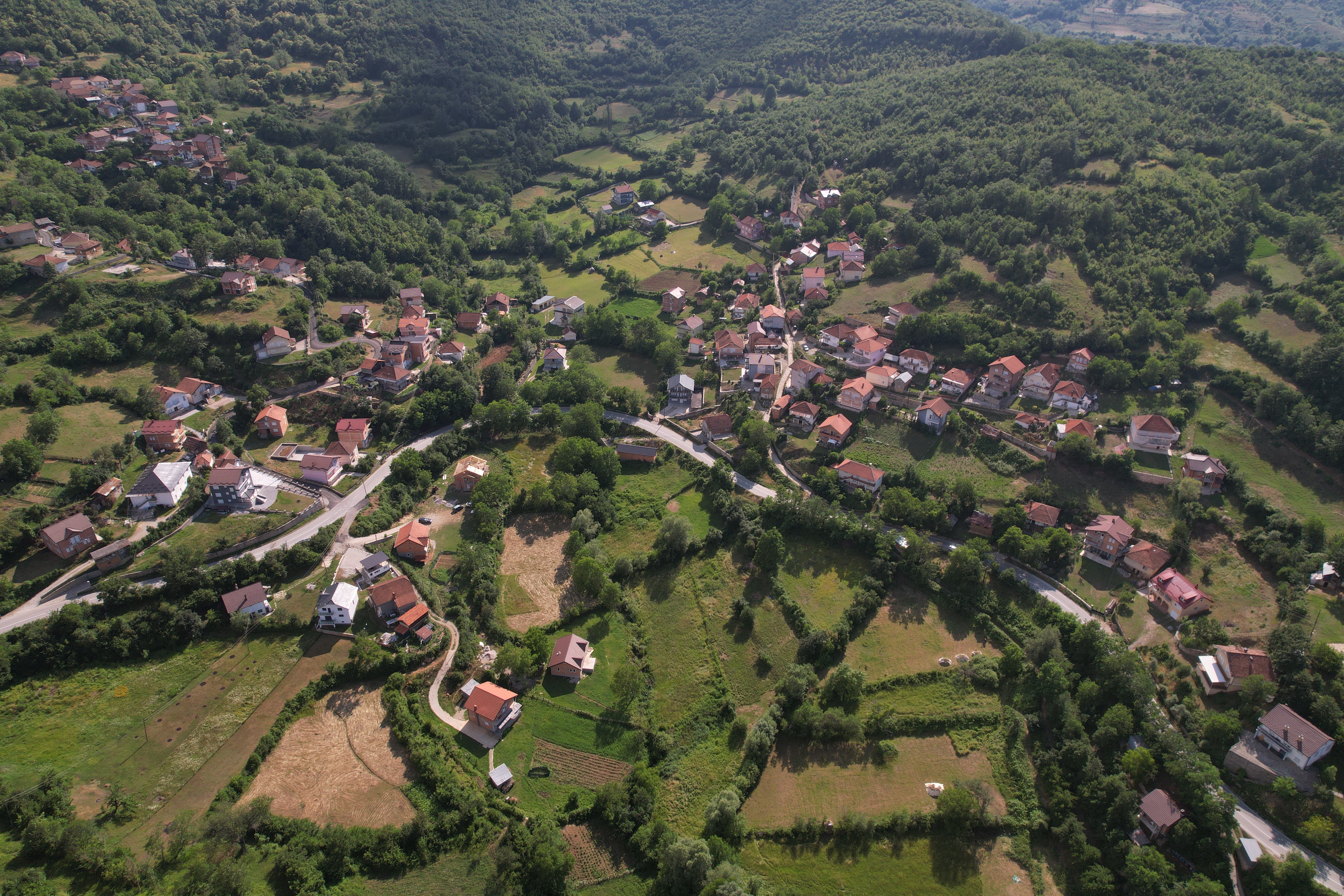
- Airview of the village

- Location within North Macedonia
- Coordinates: 41°27′N 20°31′E
- Country: North Macedonia
- Region: Southwestern
- Municipality: Debar

Population (2002)
  - Total: 530
- Time zone: UTC+1 (CET)
  - Summer (DST): UTC+2 (CEST)
- Car plates: DB
- Website: .

Otišani (Macedonian: Отишани) is a village in the municipality of Debar, North Macedonia.

== Name ==
The village in Albanian is known as Hotishani.

== Demographics ==
Otišani (Hotishani) is attested in the Ottoman defter of 1467 as a village in the timar of Hizir Muriqi (possibly, Maziqi or Mazhiqi) in the vilayet of Dulgoberda. The village had a total of five households, and the anthroponyms recorded depict a mixed Albanian-Slavic character, for example, among the household heads a certain Gjergj Karlovići is attested.

Otišani (Hotishan) is again recorded in the Ottoman defter of 1583 as a village in the vilayet of Dulgobrda. The settlement had a total of 37 households with the anthroponymy attested being mixed Slavic-Albanian in character, with a predominance of Slavic names, with the minority of Albanian anthroponyms that appear displaying instances of Slavicisation (e.g., Pejo Gjoni.). Alongside the Christians, 3 Muslim households are also registered.

In the late 20th century, Otišani was inhabited by a Torbeš population.

According to the 1942 Albanian census, Otišani was inhabited by 263 Albanians.

According to the 2002 census, the village had a total of 530 inhabitants. Ethnic groups in the village include:

- Macedonians 302
- Turks 170
- Albanians 46
- Others 12
