= Gorno Kosovrasti =

- Village
- Горно Косоврасти
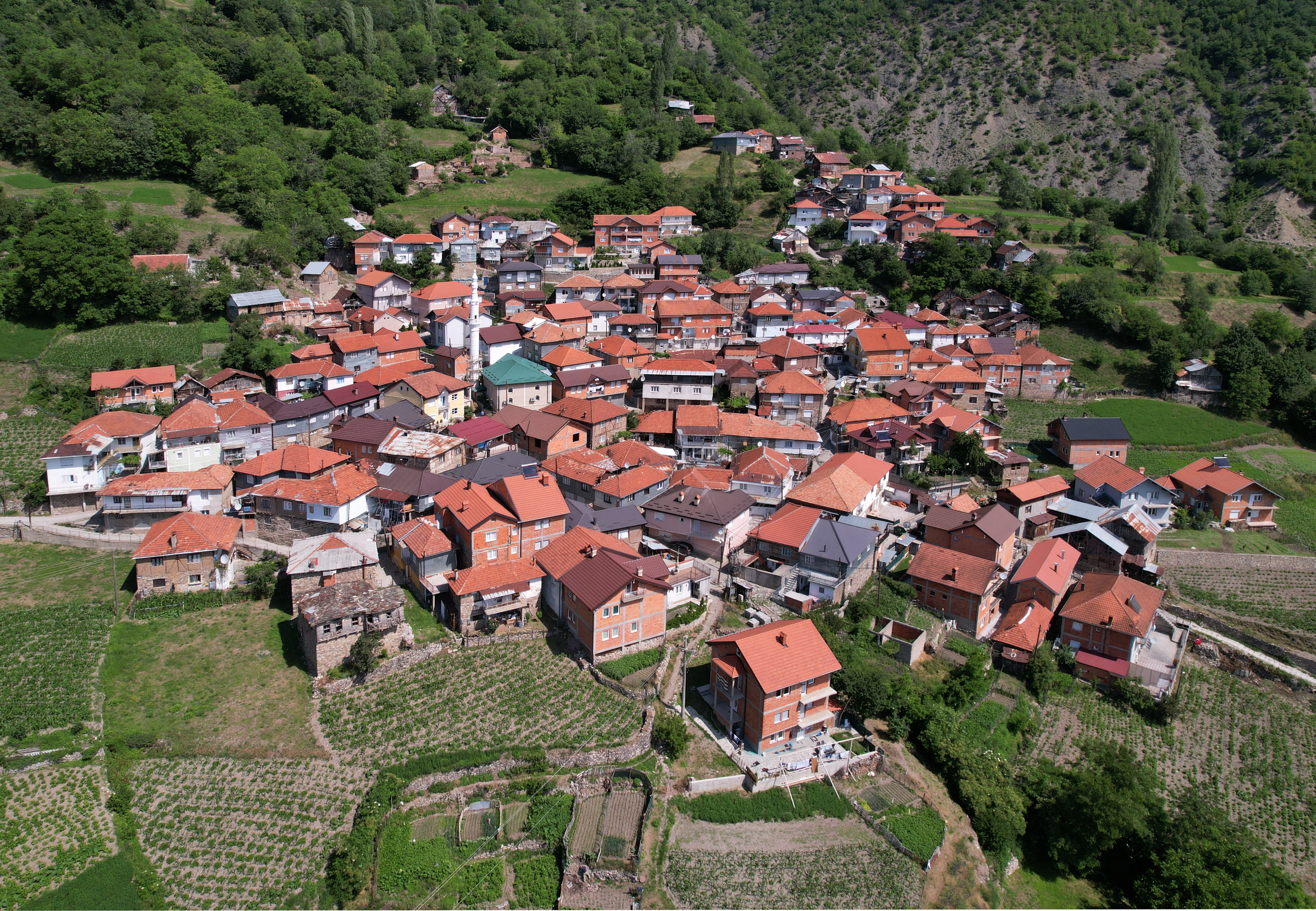
- Airview of the village

- Location within North Macedonia
- Coordinates: 41°32′53″N 20°34′32″E
- Country: North Macedonia
- Region: Southwestern
- Municipality: Debar

Population (2002)
  - Total: 818
- Time zone: UTC+1 (CET)
  - Summer (DST): UTC+2 (CEST)
- Car plates: DB
- Website: .

Gorno Kosovrasti (Macedonian: Горно Косоврасти) is a village in the municipality of Debar, North Macedonia.

== Demographics ==
Gorno Kosovrasti (Gorna Kostovraste) is attested in the Ottoman defter of 1467 as a village in the ziamet of Reka was under the authority of Karagöz Bey. The village had a total of 6 households and the anthroponymy attested was Slavic in character.

In the 1901 Ethnographic Map of the Bitola Vilayet, produced by the Sofia Cartography Institute, Gorno Kosovrati part of the Sanjak of Dibra—is depicted as a village of 153 households with a mixed population of Bulgarians, Pomaks, Albanians, and Turks.

Gorno Kosovrasti has traditionally been inhabited by a Torbeši population.

According to the 2002 census, the village had a total of 818 inhabitants. Ethnic groups in the village include:

- Macedonians 700
- Turks
- Others
