= Selokuḱi =

Selokuḱi Селокуќи Sollokiq
- Village
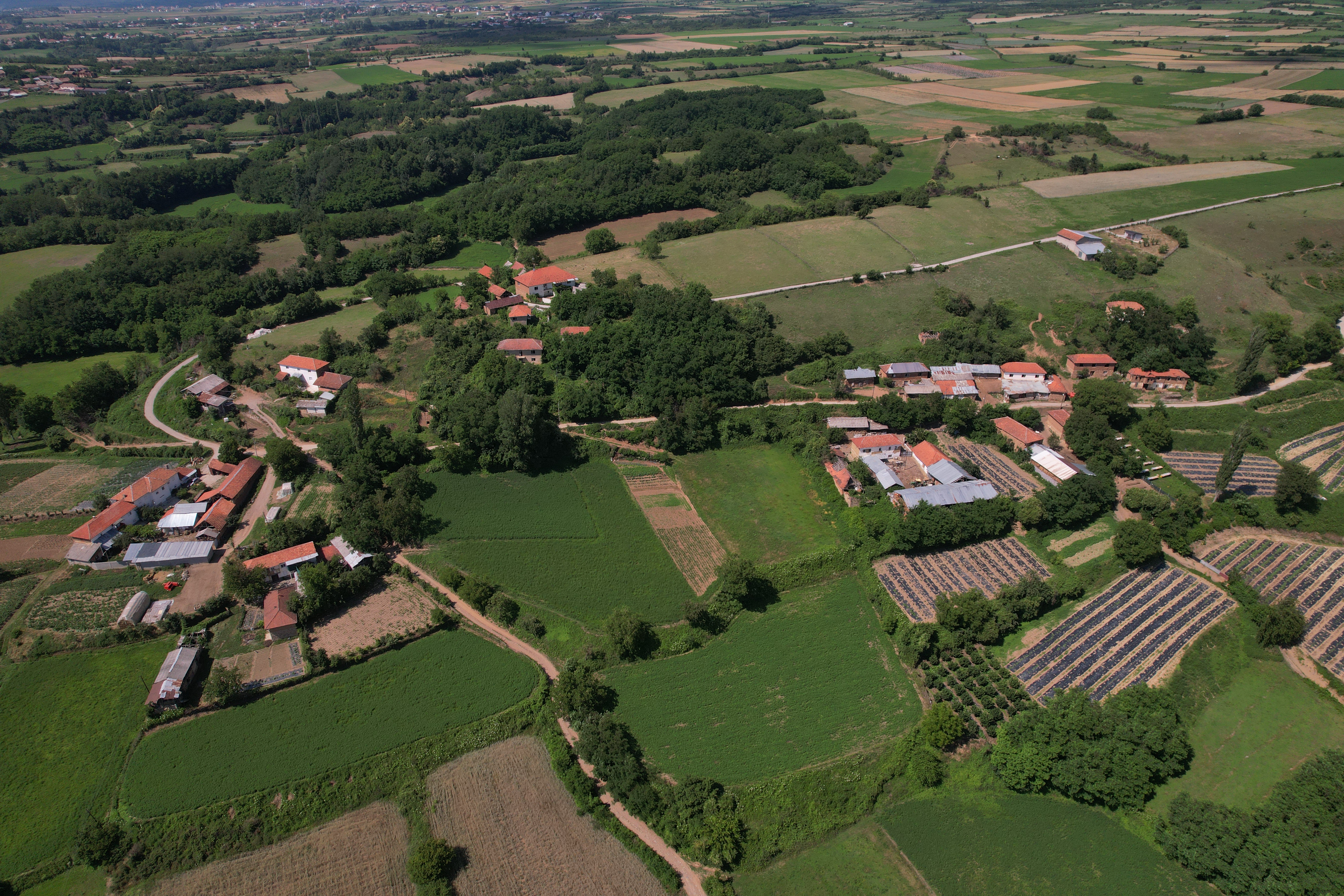
- Airview of the village

- Location within Republic of Macedonia
- Coordinates: 41°32′N 20°29′E
- Country: North Macedonia
- Region: Southwestern
- Municipality: Debar

Population (2021)
  - Total: 16
- Time zone: UTC+1 (CET)
  - Summer (DST): UTC+2 (CEST)
- Car plates: DB
- Website: .

Selokuḱi (Macedonian: Селокуќи, Albanian: Sollokiq) is a village in the municipality of Debar, North Macedonia.

== Demographics ==
Selokuḱi (Sollokiç) appears in the Ottoman defter of 1467 as a village in the vilayet of Upper Debar. The settlement had a total of 2 households and the anthroponyms recorded had an Albanian character (e.g Gjon Baga, Gjon his nephew). Selokuḱi is again recorded in the Ottoman defter of 1583 as a village in the vilayet of Upper Dibra. The settlement had grown to 20 households. The anthroponyms attested recorded were almost entirely of a Slavic character, with an Albanian anthroponym exhibiting Slavicisation also appearing. (i.e Jovan Gjin-i; etc.).

As of the 2021 census, Selokuḱi had 16 residents with the following ethnic composition:

- Persons for whom data are taken from administrative sources 16

According to the 2002 census, the village had a total of 104 inhabitants. Ethnic groups in the village include:

- Albanians 104
