= Varbitsa =

Varbitsa (Върбица, "little willow") may refer to the following places in Bulgaria:

- Varbitsa (town), a town in Shumen Province
  - Varbitsa Municipality
  - Varbitsa Pass in the Balkan Mountains
- Varbitsa, Haskovo Province, a village in Haskovo Province
- Varbitsa, Pleven Province, a village in Pleven Province
- Varbitsa, Veliko Tarnovo Province, a village in Gorna Oryahovitsa Municipality, Veliko Tarnovo Province
- Varbitsa (river), a river in the Rhodope Mountains

== See also ==
- Vrbica (disambiguation)
