= Tatar Elevci =

Tatar Elevci Татар Елевци Tatar Elevca
- Village
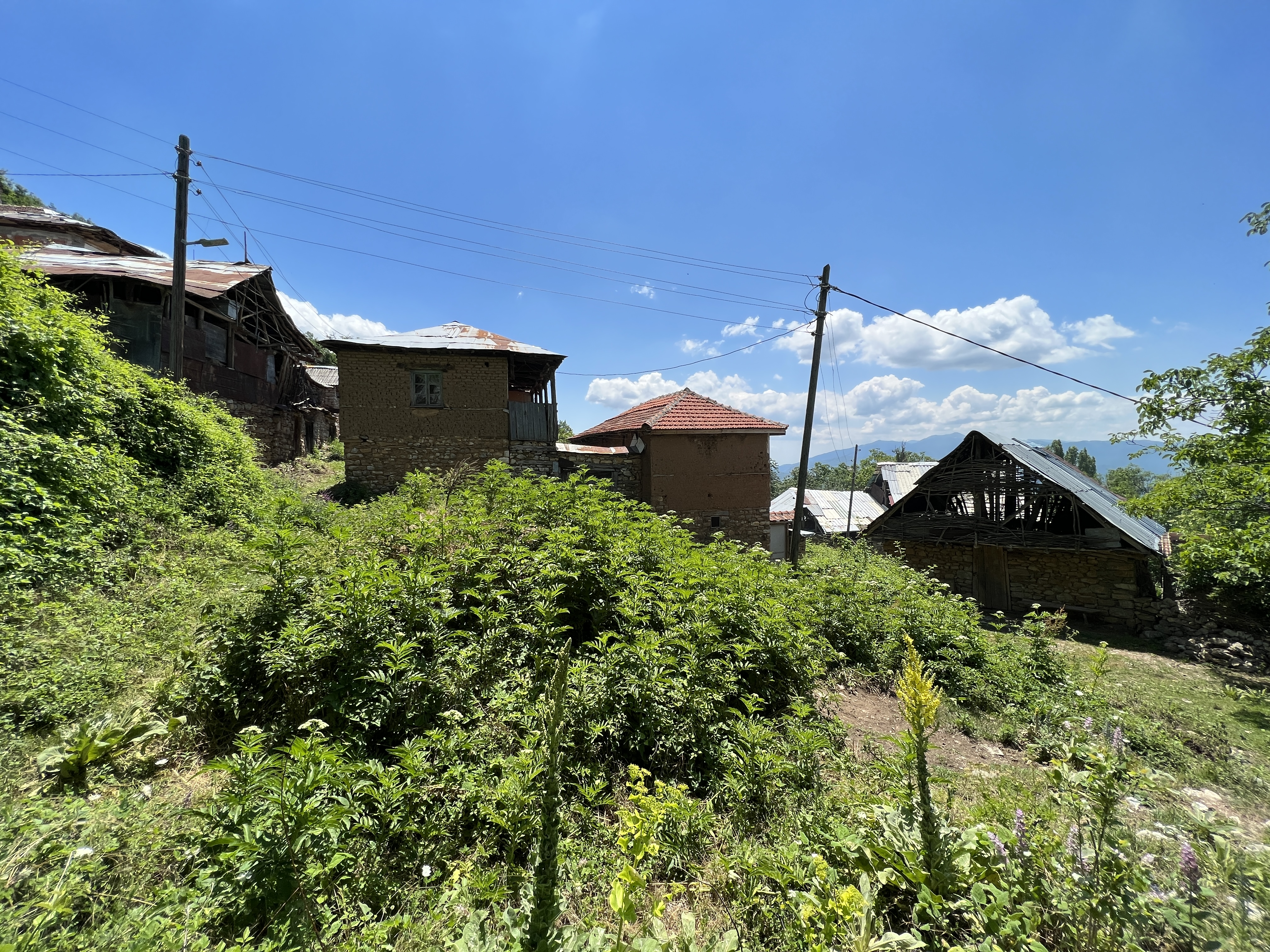
- Houses in the village

- Location within North Macedonia
- Coordinates: 41°32′N 20°33′E
- Country: North Macedonia
- Region: Southwestern
- Municipality: Debar

Population (2002)
  - Total: 10
- Time zone: UTC+1 (CET)
  - Summer (DST): UTC+2 (CEST)
- Car plates: DB
- Website: .

Tatar Elevci (Macedonian: Татар Елевци, Albanian: Tatar Elevc) is a village in the municipality of Debar, North Macedonia.

== Demographics ==
According to the 2002 census, the village had a total of 10 inhabitants. Ethnic groups in the village include:

- Macedonians 9
- Albanians 1
