= Vrbnica =

Vrbnica (approximate pronunciation: /vɜːrbˈniːtsə/) may refer to:

- Vrbnica, Slovakia, a village and municipality in Slovakia
- Vrbnica, Foča, a village in Bosnia and Herzegovina
- Vrbnica (Aleksandrovac), a village in Rasina District, central Serbia
- Vrbnica (Malo Crniće), a village in Braničevo District, eastern Serbia
- Vrbnica (Sjenica), a village in Zlatibor District, southwestern Serbia
- Vrbnica (river), a left tributary to the Piva in Montenegro
- Vërmica (Serbian: Vrbnica), a village in Prizren municipality, Kosovo
- Vërnicë (Bulgarian: Врбница) a village in Dibër, Gollobordë region, Albania

== See also ==
- Vrabnitsa
- Vrbica (disambiguation)
