= Gjoricë =

- Administrative unit
- Location within Albania
- Coordinates: 41°32′N 20°27′E
- Country: Albania
- County: Dibër
- Municipality: Bulqizë

Population (2011)
  - Administrative unit: 4,214
- Time zone: UTC+1 (CET)
  - Summer (DST): UTC+2 (CEST)

Gjoricë (IPA: [ɟɔɾit͡s]) is a former municipality in the Dibër County, eastern Albania. At the 2015 local government reform it became a subdivision of the municipality Bulqizë. The population at the 2011 census was 4,214.

== Demographics ==
In 1900, Vasil Kanchov traveled throughout the region and reported on who lived there, finding that the towns of what is now the Gjoricë municipality included Gjoricë (Bulgarian: Горица Gorica) with 900 Albanian Muslims, Viçisht with 130 Albanian Muslims and Lubalesh with 160 Albanian Muslims.

Lubalesh has some Torbeš living in the village.

During the 2000s linguists Klaus Steinke and Xhelal Ylli in search of Slavic speaking villages in Albania carried out fieldwork in settlements of the area. They visited villages such as Gjoricë and in that area found no Slavic speaking populations. Additionally detailed interviews with local inhabitants did not indicate that there where other places with Slavic speaking people inhabitants in this area.

== Notable people ==
- Vladan Gjurica, one of the principal advisors of Skanderbeg and chief army quartermaster
