= Qaf-Buall mine =

Chromium mine in Bulqizë, Dibër County, Albania

- Location in Albania
- Location: Bulqizë, Dibër County, Albania; 41°29′30″N 20°13′19″E
- Products: Chromium
- Opened: 1942
- Closed: 2006
- Company: State owned

The Qaf-Buall mine is a large mine located in central Albania in Dibër County, 40 kilometres (25 mi) east of the capital, Tirana. Qaf-Buall represents one of the largest chromium reserve in Albania and one of the largest in Europe having estimated reserves of 1.5 million tonnes of ore grading 39.44% chromium metal. The mine is part of the Bulqizë Massif, a 370 square kilometres (140 mi^{2}) area which has a rock thickness between 4 kilometres (2.5 mi) and 6 kilometres (3.7 mi) and contains 65 verified chromium deposits and occurrences. The deposit has been explored to depths of up to 1,300 metres (4,300 ft) and the geological reserves amount to 12 million tonnes of which 7.5 million tonnes grading over 38% chromium metal.

The Qaf-Buall mine began operating in 1983. Between 1983 and 1985 it produced chromium ore only from occurrences. In 1989 production from the mine started. The total combined chromium ore production from the mine between 1989 and 2006 amounted to 6,000 tonnes. The deepest level of the mine is the Level +420 which reaches a depth of 420 metres (1,380 ft). The chromium ore reserves of the mine are split into two categories above and below Level +420. The proven ore reserves located above the Level +420 amount to 1,500,000 tonnes of ore grading 39.44% chromium metal. The proven ore reserves located below the Level +420 are currently not estimated or calculated but are expected to be grading over 40% chromium metal. The mine's total reserves amount to 1.5 million tonnes of ore grading 39.44% chromium metal. Since 2006 the mine is unoccupied and no economic activity is recorded at the site. The Qaf-Buall mine is one of the eight Albanian chromium mines to have reserves of over 1 million tonnes of chromium ore.
