= Zerqan =

- Administrative unit
- Location within Albania
- Coordinates: 41°30′N 20°21′E
- Country: Albania
- County: Dibër
- Municipality: Bulqizë

Population (2011)
  - Administrative unit: 4,111
- Time zone: UTC+1 (CET)
  - Summer (DST): UTC+2 (CEST)
- Website: https://web.archive.org/web/20110430105023/http://www.komuna-zerqan.gov.al:80/

Zerqan (Albanian pronunciation: IPA: [zɛɾcan]) is a village and a former municipality in Dibër County, eastern Albania. At the 2015 local government reform, it became a subdivision of the municipality Bulqizë. The population at the 2011 census was 4,111.

== Historical demographics ==
Zerqan (Zirklani) appears in the Ottoman defter of 1467 as a settlement in the vilayet of Dulgoberda. The village had a total of 11 households represented by the following household heads: Pop Dimitri, Gjureja son of Gjoni, Andrije brother of Pop Dimitri, Dimitri Pllasha, Kolë Sigori, Obertkoja son of Pop, Tanush Arbenasi, Kolë Osmaku, Andreja Kimëza, Martin Mimiza, and Gjergj Liu.

In 1900, Vasil Kanchov gathered and compiled statistics on demographics in the area, finding a mainly Albanian area in and around Zerqan: the villages of Zerqan, Smollik, Sofraçan, and Sopot were all entirely Albanian inhabited, while Tërnovë was inhabited by Slavic Muslims.
