= Bomovo =

Bomovo Бомово Bohmovë
- Village
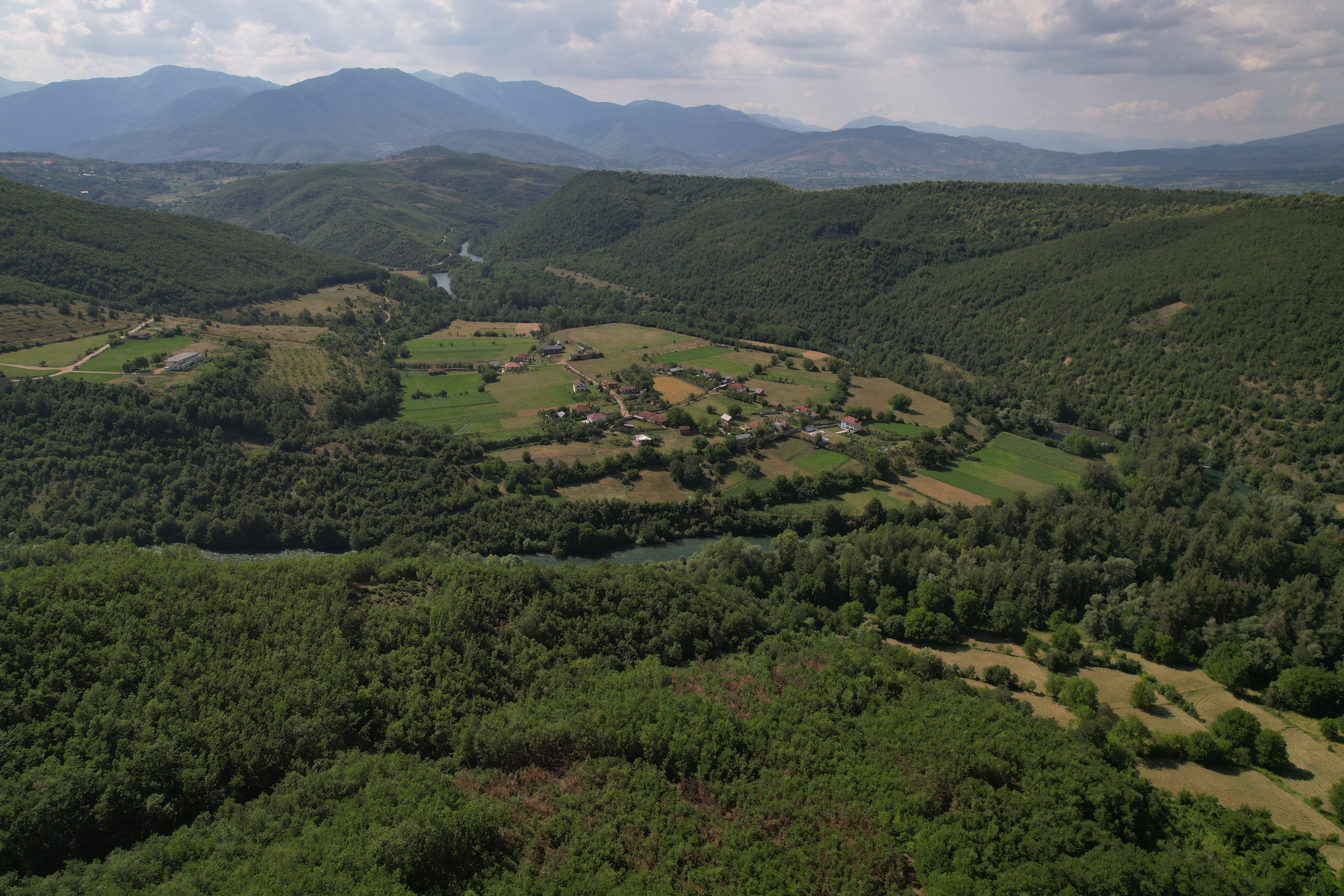
- View of the former location of the village

- Location within North Macedonia
- Coordinates: 41°30′17″N 20°28′49″E
- Country: North Macedonia
- Region: Southwestern
- Municipality: Debar

Population (2002)
  - Total: 0
- Time zone: UTC+1 (CET)
  - Summer (DST): UTC+2 (CEST)
- Car plates: DB
- Website: .

Bomovo (Macedonian: Бомово, Albanian: Bohmovë) is an abandoned village in the municipality of Debar, North Macedonia.

== Demographics ==
Bomovo (Bohmago) is recorded in the Ottoman defter of 1467 as a village in the vilayet of Upper Dibra. The settlement had 1 household and the anthroponymy attested was Slavic in character (e.g., Nenko Pavlović).

Bomovo (Bohmovo) is again recorded in the Ottoman defter of 1583 as a village in the vilayet of Upper Dibra. The settlement had a total of 13 households with the anthroponymy attested being of a mixed Albanian-Slavic and generally Christian character with a predominance of Slavic names as well as instances of Slavicisation (e.g., Gjurgj Gjergji). The village had 1 Muslim household.

The 1971 Yugoslav census was the last to record any people as residing in the village which contained 166 inhabitants, of which 164 were Albanians and 2 others. According to the 2002 census, the village had 0 inhabitants.
