= Trnaniḱ =

Trnaniḱ Трнаниќ Taranik
- Village
- Location within North Macedonia
- Coordinates: 41°30′06″N 20°29′26″E
- Country: North Macedonia
- Region: Southwestern
- Municipality: Debar

Population (2002)
  - Total: 0
- Time zone: UTC+1 (CET)
  - Summer (DST): UTC+2 (CEST)
- Car plates: DB
- Website: .

Trnaniḱ (Macedonian: Трнаниќ, Albanian: Taranik) is a village in the municipality of Debar, North Macedonia.

== Demographics ==
The 1971 Yugoslav census was the last to record any people as residing in the village which at the time contained 45 inhabitants, all of which were Albanians. According to the 2002 census, the village had 0 inhabitants.
