= Vlahna mine =

Chromium mine in Bulqizë, Bulqizë County, Albania

- Location in Albania
- Location: Bulqizë, Bulqizë County, Albania; 42°14′N 20°06′E
- Products: Chromium
- Opened: 1986

The Vlahna mine is a large mine located in northern Albania in Bulqizë County, 256 kilometres (159 mi) north-east of the capital, Tirana. Vlahna represents the second largest chromium reserve in Albania and one of the largest in Europe having estimated reserves of 2.56 million tonnes of ore grading 29.2% chromium metal. The mine is part of the Tropojë Massif, a 440 square kilometres (170 mi^{2}) area which has a rock thickness between 6 kilometres (3.7 mi) and 8 kilometres (5.0 mi) and contains 286 verified chromium deposits and occurrences. The deposit has been explored to depths of up to 300 metres (980 ft) and the geological reserves amount to 6.1 million tonnes grading 26.48% chromium metal.

The Vlahna mine began operating in 1986. The total combined chromium ore production from the mine between 1986 and 2006 amounted to 45,000 tonnes. The deepest level of the mine is the Profile 16 which reaches a depth of 370 metres (1,210 ft). The chromium ore reserves of the mine are split into two categories above and below Profile 16. The proven ore reserves located above the Profile 16 amount to 2,560,000 tonnes of ore grading 29.2% chromium metal. The proven ore reserves located below the Profile 16 are currently not estimated or calculated but are expected to be grading 38% chromium metal. The mine's total reserves amount to 2.56 million tonnes of ore grading 29.2% chromium metal. The southern part of the mine is owned by private investors and the central and northern part of the mine is unoccupied. The Vlahna mine is one of the eight Albanian chromium mines to have reserves of over 1 million tonnes of chromium ore.
