= Elez Koçi =

Albanian politician (1856–1916)

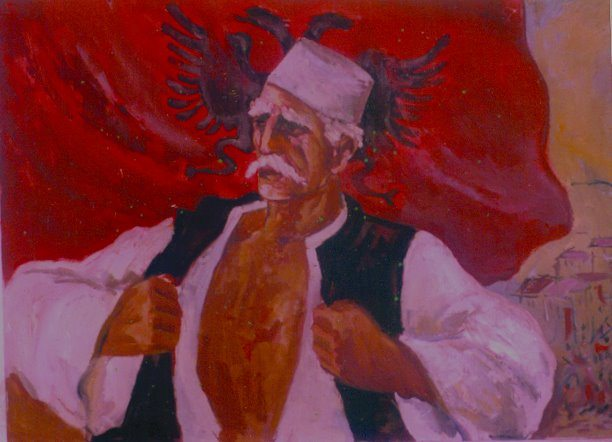
Painting of Elez Koçi.

Elez Koci (Elez Sadik Koçi) (1856–1916) was a prominent Albanian independence activist from the region of Dibër, Albania. He was born on 1856, in Ostren i Madh, Dibër, in the present-day municipality of Bulqizë. He attended elementary studies in Debar and in 1876 finished the theological high school in Monastir.

He participated in the 1908 Congress of Monastir which established the Albanian alphabet and also lead a revolt against a new Ottoman administration in the region of Diber in 1911 and was subsequently arrested and sentenced 3 years in prison for rebellion. Ottoman Empire’s delicate and weakening position allowed him to be released early and he was able to participate as a delegate, in the proclamation of independence in Vlora on November 28, 1912.

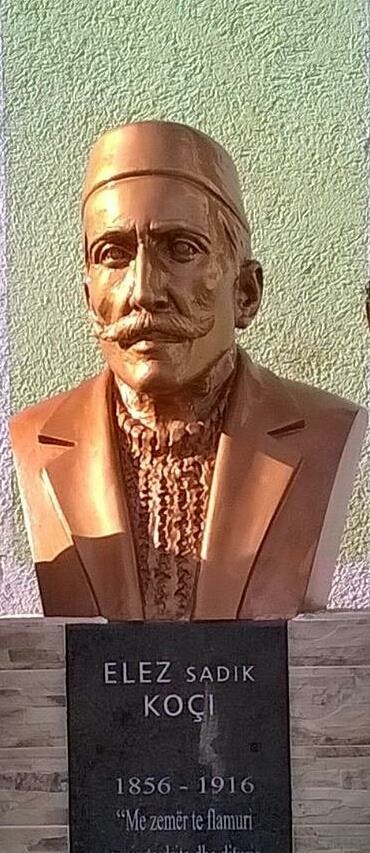
Bust of Elez Koçi at the "Elez Koci" High School in Greater Ostren..

By 1915 when Bulgaria proclaimed war against Serbia and occupied northeastern territories of Albania, he led an armed uprising to oppose the newly Bulgarian installed institutions. Elez Koçi was planning to raise the Albanian flag on March 4, 1916 and proclaim independence from Bulgaria. He was captured that same day by Bulgarian forces, tortured and executed along with Qazim Duka, another prominent leader. They were buried while they were still alive, in the vicinity of the Vërnicë town in Dibër.

He was awarded the title “Martyr of the Fatherland” by the Executive Committee of the District of Diber on May 23, 1978. He was also awarded the Order Of Freedom, 3rd Class and has been recommended to the office of the President of the Republic of Albania, to be awarded with the Order of Scanderbeg. "Elez Koçi" High School in the town of Ostren i Madh, was named after him in 1990.

== Gallery ==
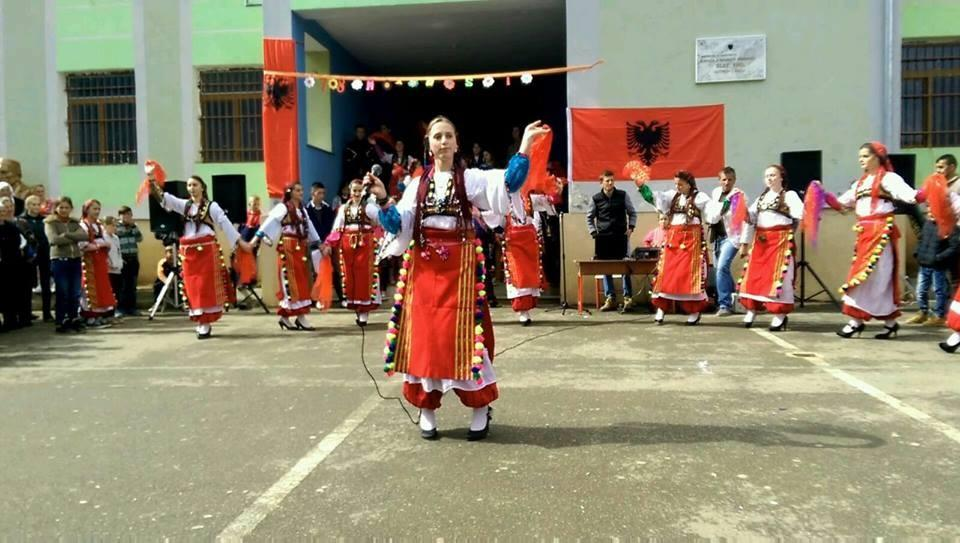
Independence Day at "Elez Koci" High School in Greater Ostren.

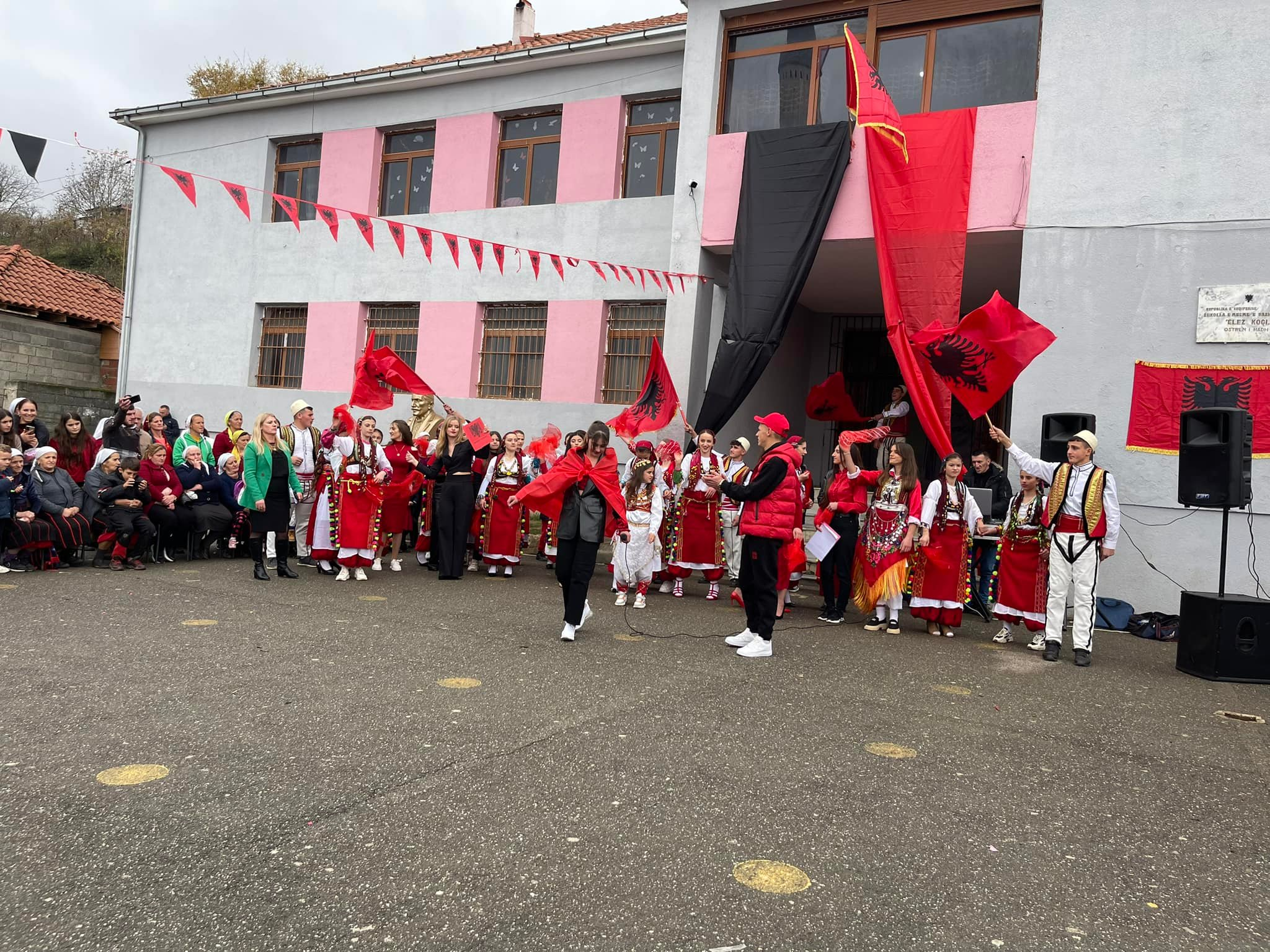
Independence Day on November 28, 2023 at "Elez Koci" High School in Greater Ostren.
