= Krivci =

Krivci Кривци Krivcë
- Village
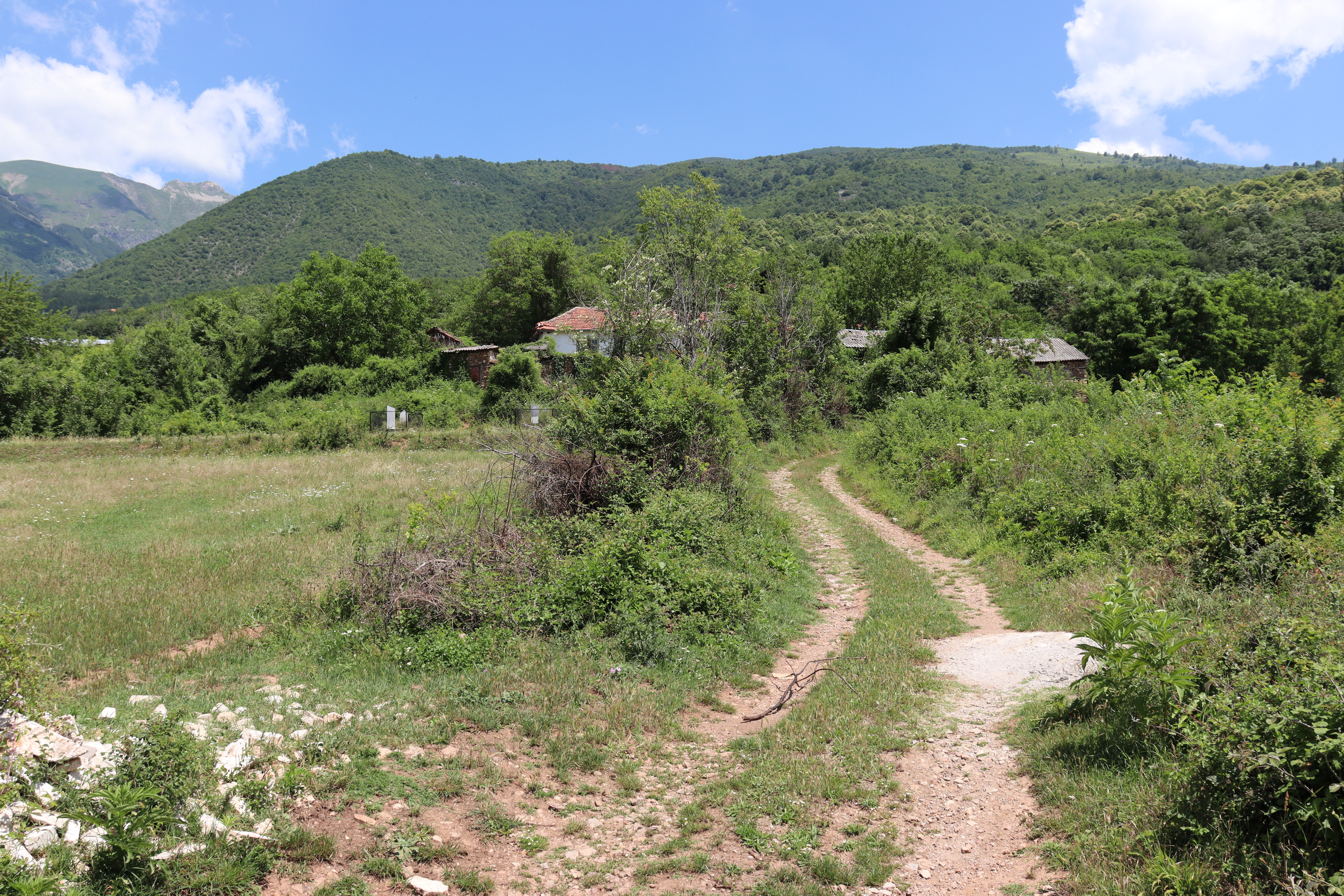
- View of the village

- Location within Republic of Macedonia
- Coordinates: 41°33′N 20°31′E
- Country: North Macedonia
- Region: Southwestern
- Municipality: Debar

Population (2021 [census] (3) 2024 [local] (0))
  - Total: 0
- Time zone: UTC+1 (CET)
  - Summer (DST): UTC+2 (CEST)
- Car plates: DB
- Website: .

Krivci (Macedonian: Кривци, Albanian: Krivcë) is an abandoned village in the municipality of Debar, North Macedonia.

== Demographics ==
Krivci (Krifçi ) is recorded in the Ottoman defter of 1583 as a neighborhood in the city of Rahovnik, in the vilayet of Upper Debar. The settlement had a total of 36 households, of whom 16 were Christian and 20 Muslim. The Christian anthroponymy attested was mixed Slavic-Albanian in character, with Slavic names predominating and the minority of Albanian anthroponyms that appear also displaying instances of Slavicisation (e.g., Bodo Duka, Lash Noba, Koko Gjorgji etc.).

As of the 2021 census, Krivci had 3 residents with the following ethnic composition:

- Albanians 3

According to the 2002 census, the village had a total of 9 inhabitants. Ethnic groups in the village include:

- Albanians 9
