= Thekna mine =

Chromium mine in Bulqizë, Dibër County, Albania

- Location in Albania
- Location: Bulqizë, Dibër County, Albania; 41°29′30″N 20°13′19″E
- Products: Chromium
- Opened: 1959

The Thekna mine is a large mine located in central Albania in Dibër County, 40 kilometres (25 mi) east of the capital, Tirana. Thekna represents one of the largest chromium reserve in Albania and one of the largest in Europe having estimated reserves of 0.652 million tonnes of ore grading 38% chromium metal. The mine is part of the Bulqizë Massif, a 370 square kilometres (140 mi^{2}) area which has a rock thickness between 4 kilometres (2.5 mi) and 6 kilometres (3.7 mi) and contains 65 verified chromium deposits and occurrences. The deposit has been explored to depths of up to 1,560 metres (5,120 ft) and the geological reserves amount to 12 million tonnes of which 7.5 million tonnes grading over 38% chromium metal.

The Thekna mine began operating in 1959. Between 1957 and 1959 it produced chromium ore only from occurrences. In 1959 production from the mine started. The total combined chromium ore production from the mine between 1959 and 2006 amounted to 1,198,000 tonnes. The deepest level of the mine is the Descenderia No.7 which reaches a depth of 1,560 metres (5,120 ft). The chromium ore reserves of the mine are split into two categories above and below Descenderia No.7. The proven ore reserves located above the Descenderia No.7 amount to 652,300 tonnes of ore grading 38% chromium metal. The proven ore reserves located below the Descenderia No.7 are currently not estimated or calculated but are expected to be grading 45% chromium metal. The mine's total reserves amount to 0.652 million tonnes of ore grading 38% chromium metal. The mine was privatised in 1999.
