= Slavyanovo =

Town in Pleven Province, Bulgaria

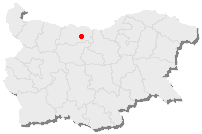
Location of Slavyanovo in Bulgaria

Slavyanovo (Bulgarian: Славяново [sɫɐˈvʲanovo]) is a town in the Pleven Municipality, in Pleven Province, Bulgaria.

It lies in the Danubian Plain, to the north-northeast of Pleven. As of December 2009, it had a population of 4,422. The mayor is Asen Bachev. The town is located at 43°28′N 24°52′E, 114 metres above sea level.

Slavyanovo's old name is Turski Trastenik (Турски Тръстеник) and it existed in the 18th century. It was officially declared a town in 1974. Slavyanovo is a partner of German town Kaiserslautern. The population is mainly Eastern Orthodox and there is a church, but at least in the 1930s there was also a small Protestant community. Most residents are Bulgarians, though the town has a growing Roma population, also presently living descendants of Crimean Tatars.

== Gallery ==
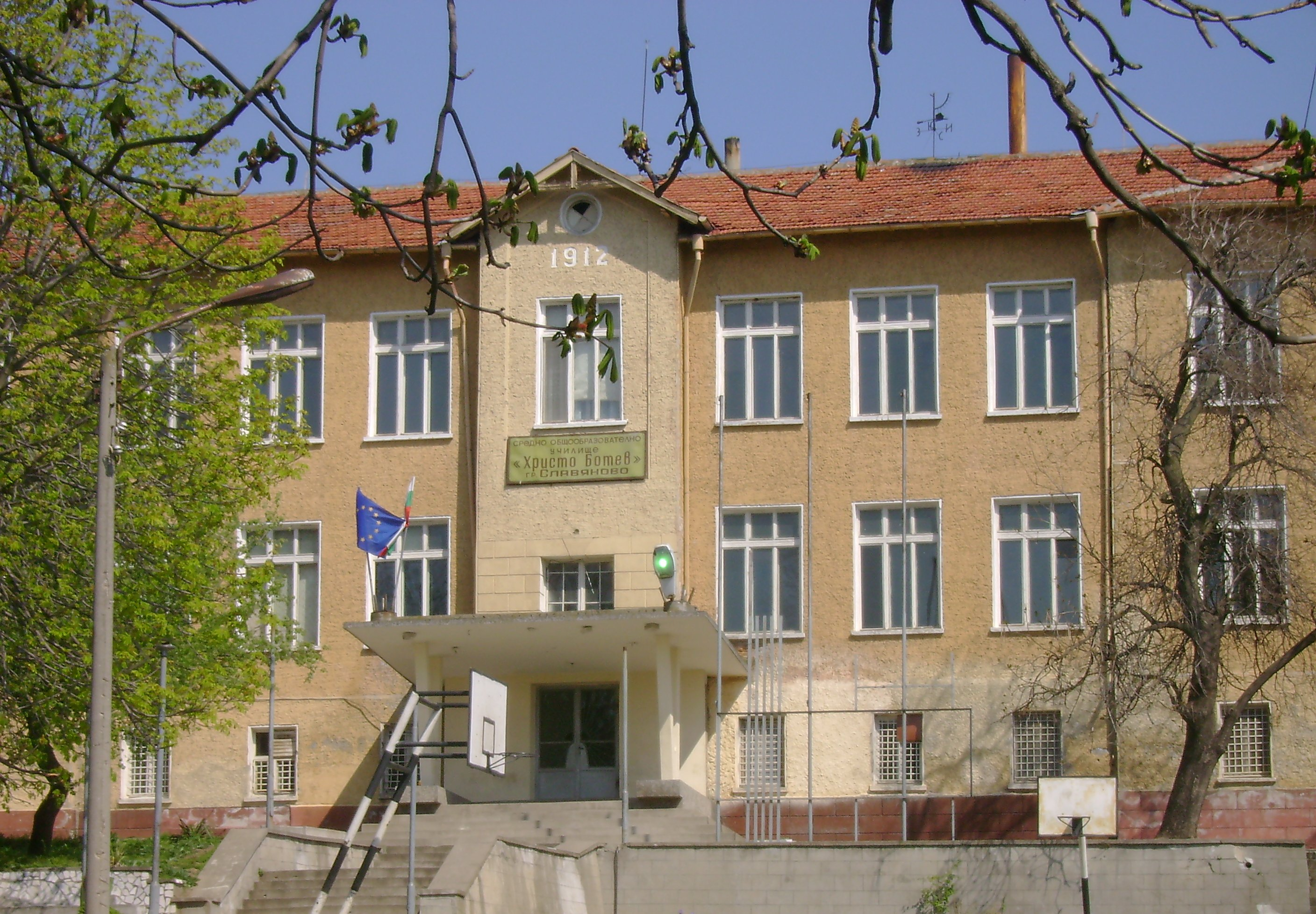
Hristo Botev School (1912)

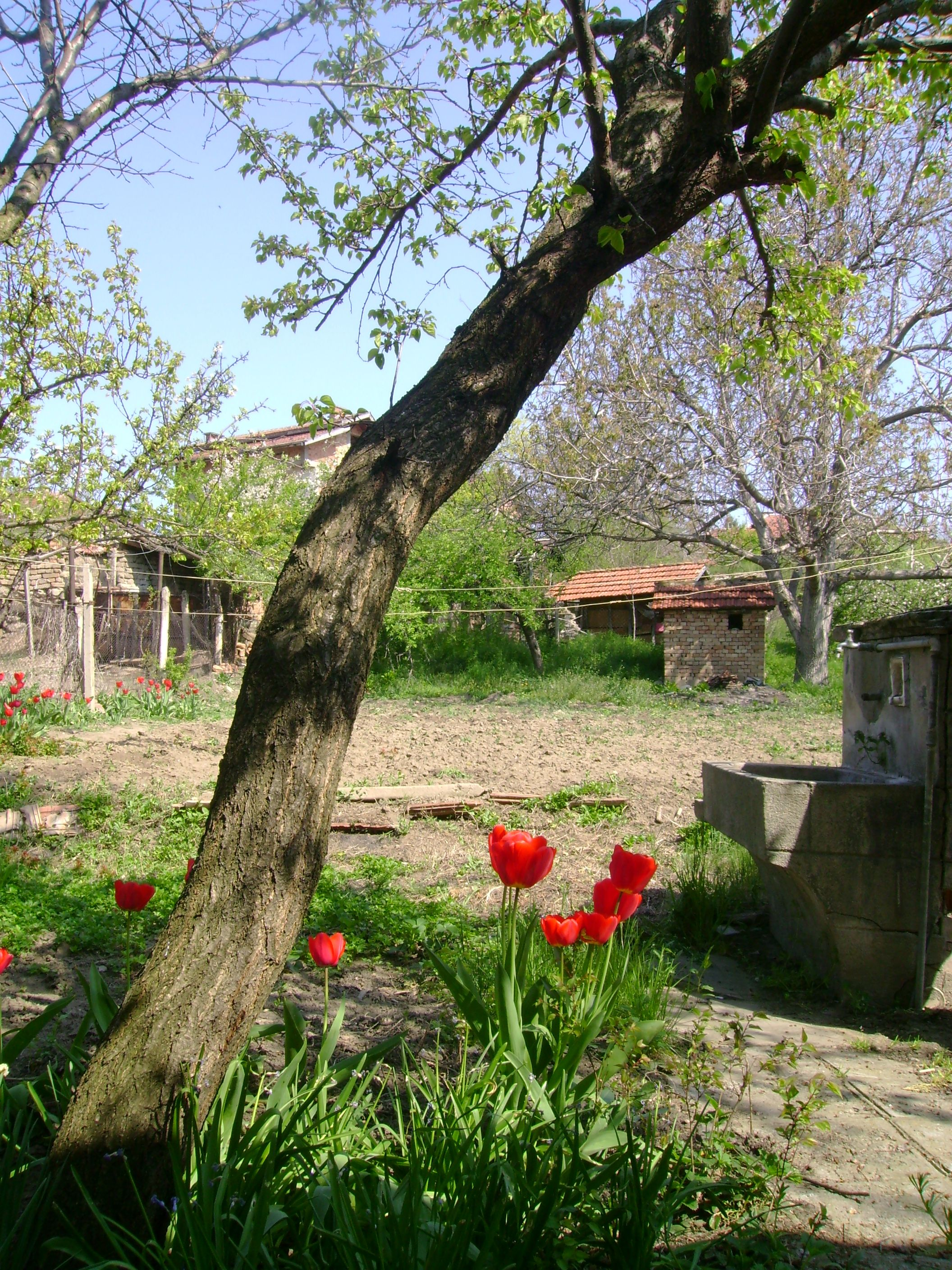
An inner yard

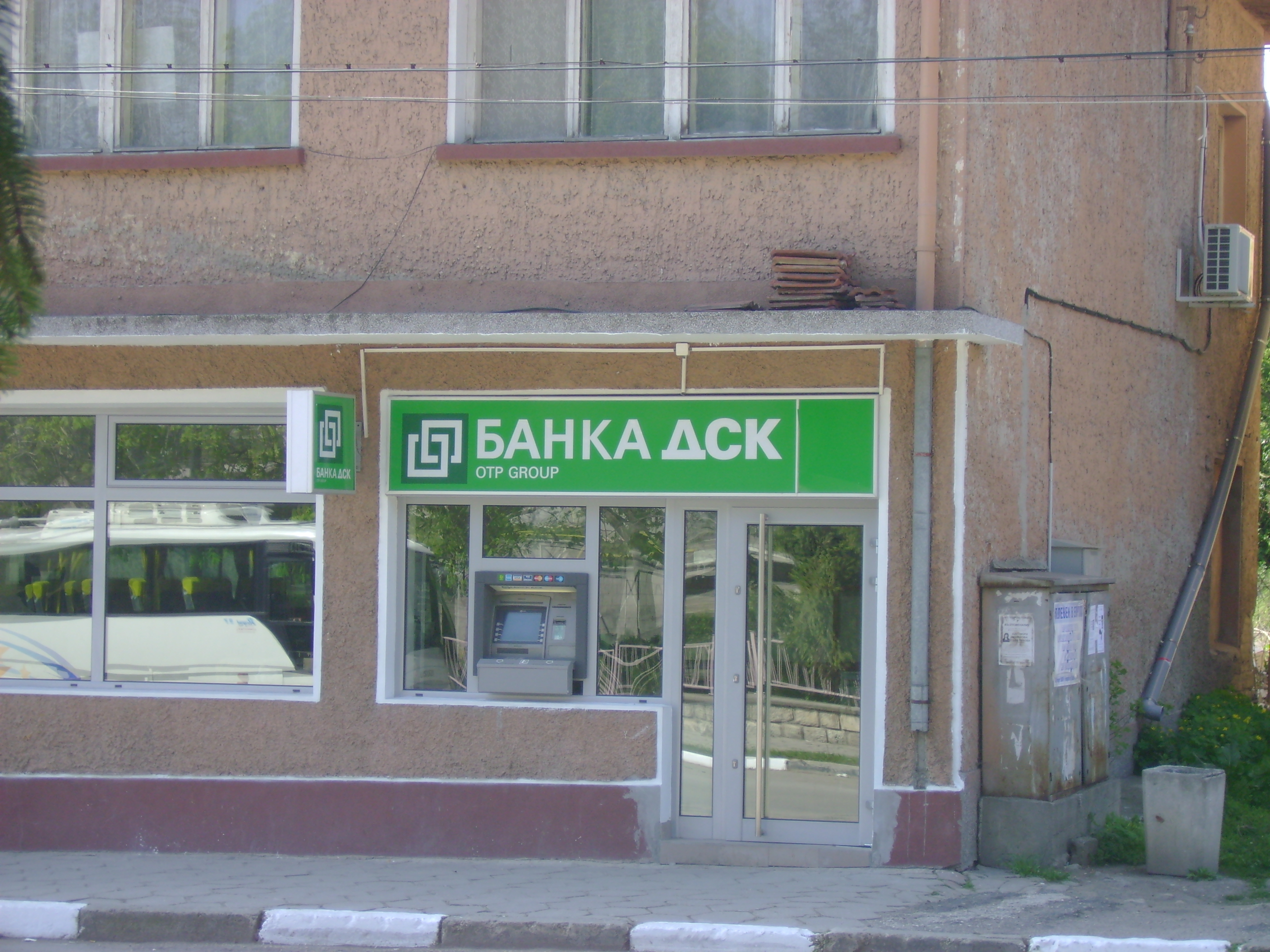
Local DSK Bank office

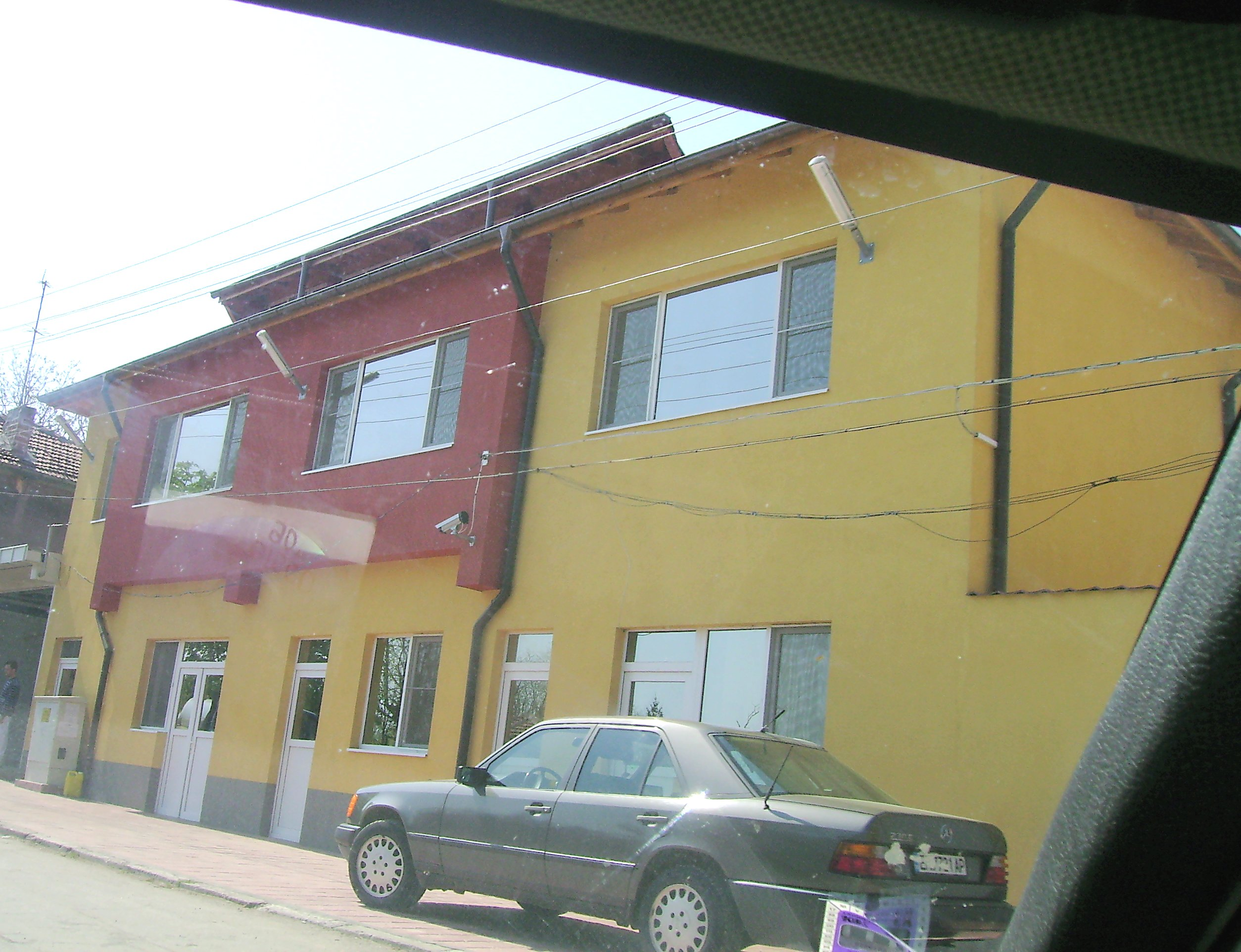
Private milk factory
