= Shupenzë =

- Administrative unit
- Location within Albania
- Coordinates: 41°32′N 20°25′E
- Country: Albania
- County: Dibër
- Municipality: Bulqizë

Population (2011)
  - Administrative unit: 5,503
- Time zone: UTC+1 (CET)
  - Summer (DST): UTC+2 (CEST)

Shupenzë is a village and a former municipality in the Dibër County, eastern Albania. At the 2015 local government reform it became a subdivision of the municipality Bulqizë. The population at the 2011 census was 5,503.

== Historical demographics ==
In 1900, Vasil Kanchov gathered and compiled statistics on demographics in the area and reported the populations of ten villages in the modern municipality, including Bllacë, Boçevë, Homesh (Bulgarian: Омеже Omezhe), Kovashicë, Mazhicë, Okshatinë, Shtushaj, Topojan, Vlashaj and Zogjaj. All ten were reported as being Albanian-inhabited, with a total population amongst them of 4080.
