= Bukovlak =

Bukovlak Буковлък
- Village
- Location within Bulgaria
- Coordinates: 43°26′43″N 24°36′48″E
- Country: Bulgaria
- Oblast: Pleven
- Opština: Pleven

Government
  - Mayor (Municipality): Valentin Hristov (GERB)
  - Mayor (Town Hall): Georgi Bazhinov (DPS)

Area
  - Total: 21.379 km^{2} (8.254 sq mi)
- Elevation: 107 m (351 ft)

Population (2024)
  - Total: 4,407
  - Density: 206.1/km^{2} (533.9/sq mi)
- Postal code: 5839
- Area code: 063568
- Vehicle registration: EH

Bukovlak (Bulgarian: Буковлък) is a village in Bulgaria. It is situated in Pleven municipality, Pleven Province.
