= Fushë-Bulqizë =

- Administrative unit
- Location within Albania
- Coordinates: 41°31′N 20°18′E
- Country: Albania
- County: Dibër
- Municipality: Bulqizë

Population (2011)
  - Administrative unit: 3,342
- Time zone: UTC+1 (CET)
  - Summer (DST): UTC+2 (CEST)

Fushë-Bulqizë is a village and a former municipality in the Dibër County, eastern Albania. At the 2015 local government reform, it became a subdivision of the municipality Bulqizë. The population at the 2011 census was 3,342. The etymology of Fushë-Bulqizë from the Albanian language translates to in English as “Field of Bulqizë” referring to being the field of the region.
