= Pleven Municipality =

Pleven Municipality Община Плевен
- Municipality
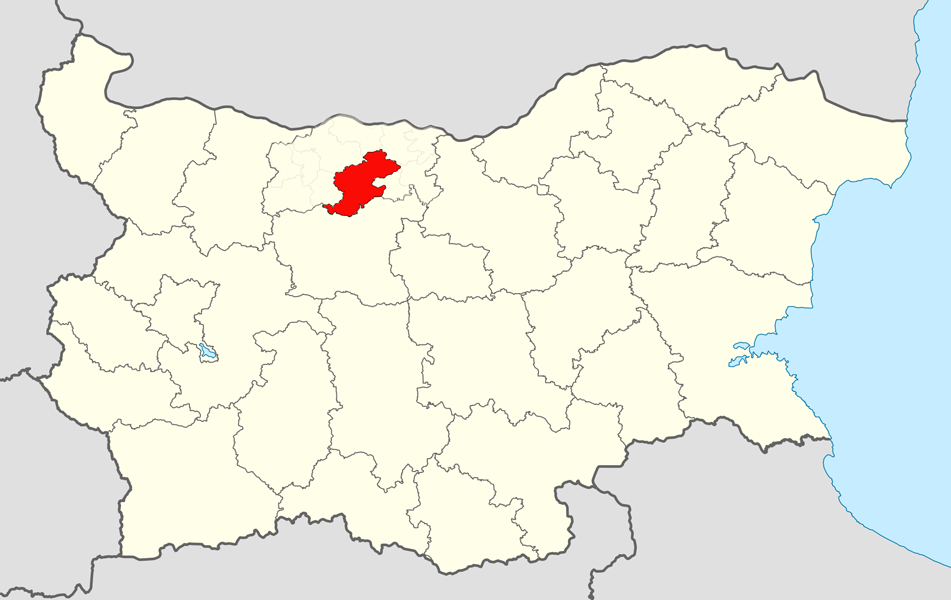
- Pleven Municipality within Bulgaria and Pleven Province.
- Coordinates: 43°25′N 24°37′E
- Country: Bulgaria
- Province (Oblast): Pleven
- Admin. centre (Obshtinski tsentar): Pleven

Area
  - Total: 812.10 km^{2} (313.55 sq mi)

Population (December 2009)▼
  - Total: 138,095
  - Density: 170.05/km^{2} (440.42/sq mi)
- Time zone: UTC+2 (EET)
  - Summer (DST): UTC+3 (EEST)

Pleven Municipality (Bulgarian: Община Плевен) is a municipality (obshtina) in Pleven Province, Northern Bulgaria. It is named after its administrative centre - the city of Pleven which is also the capital of the Province.

The municipality embraces a territory of 812.10 km^{2} (313.55 sq mi) with a population, as of December 2009, of 138,095 inhabitants.

== Settlements ==
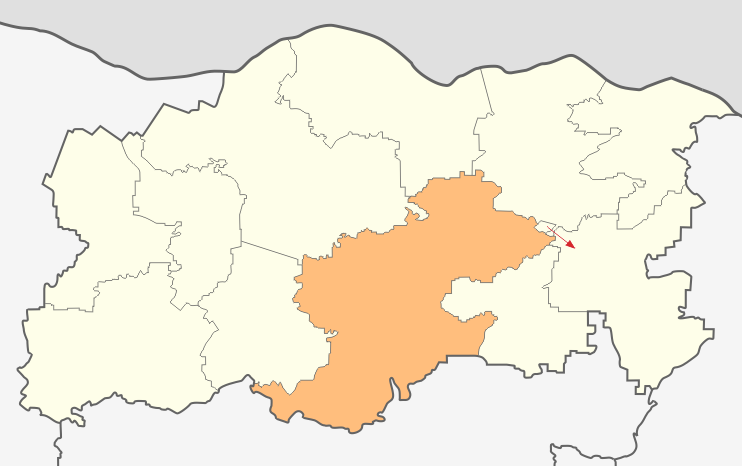
Pleven Municipality within Pleven Province

(towns are shown in bold):

Town/Village	Cyrillic	Population (December 2009)
**Pleven**	**Плевен**	111,426
Beglezh	Беглеж	782
Bohot	Бохот	880
Brestovets	Брестовец	1,124
Brashlyanitsa	Бръшляница	848
Bukovlak	Буковлък	3,850
Varbitsa	Върбица	656
Gortalovo	Горталово	186
Grivitsa	Гривица	1,778
Disevitsa	Дисевица	1,127
Koilovtsi	Коиловци	1,123
Kartozhabene	Къртожабене	141
Kashin	Къшин	303
Laskar	Ласкар	129
Mechka	Мечка	849
Nikolaevo	Николаево	740
Opanets	Опанец	1796
Pelishat	Пелишат	794
Radishevo	Радишево	507
Ralevo	Ралево	347
**Slavyanovo**	**Славяново**	4,422
Todorovo	Тодорово	425
Tuchenitsa	Тученица	339
Tarnene	Търнене	987
Yasen	Ясен	2536
Total		138,095

== Demography ==
The following table shows the change of the population during the last four decades.

Pleven Municipality
Year	1975	1985	1992	2001	2005	2007	2009	2011
Population	145,380	161,991	160,480	149,174	140,967	139,573	138,095	...
Sources: Census 2001, Census 2011, „pop-stat.mashke.org“,

=== Religion ===
According to the latest Bulgarian census of 2011, the religious composition, among those who answered the optional question on religious identification, was the following:

Religious composition of Pleven Municipality
Orthodox Christianity	80.8%
Catholicism	1.1%
Protestantism	0.8%
Islam	1.9%
No religion	7.9%
Prefer not to answer, others and indefinable	7.5%

== See also ==
- Provinces of Bulgaria
- Municipalities of Bulgaria
- List of cities and towns in Bulgaria
