= Vrbnica (Aleksandrovac) =

- Village
- Location within Serbia
- Coordinates: 43°29′N 20°58′E
- Country: Serbia
- District: Šumadija
- Municipality: Aleksandrovac

Population (2002)
  - Total: 518
- Time zone: UTC+1 (CET)
  - Summer (DST): UTC+2 (CEST)

Vrbnica (Serbian: Врбница) is a village in the municipality of Aleksandrovac, Serbia.

== Demographics ==
According to the 2002 census, the village has a population of 518 people.

== See also ==
- List of populated places in Serbia
