= Varbitsa, Pleven Province =

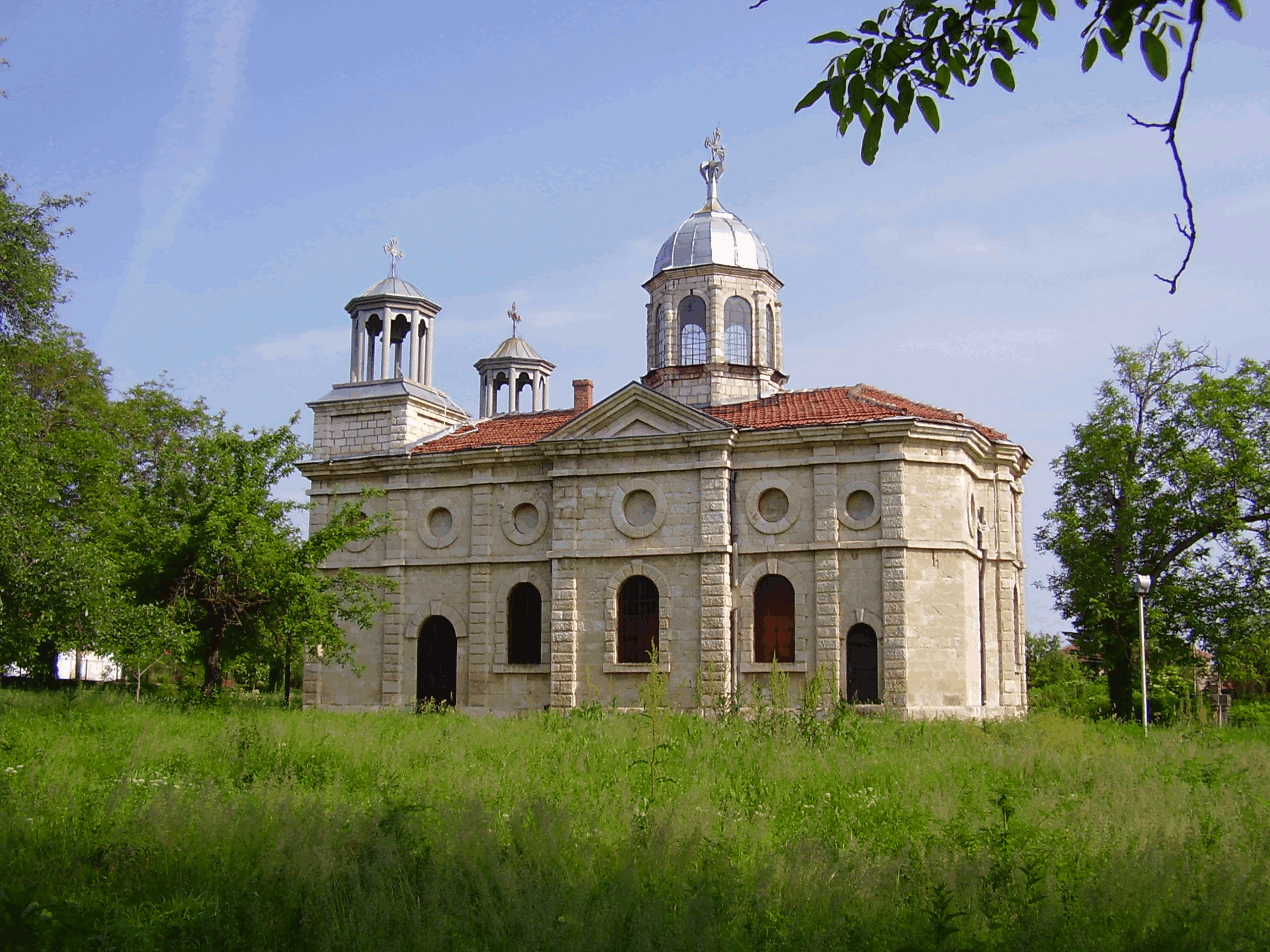
- Church Presentation of Mary, Varbitsa, Bulgaria
- Interactive map of Varbitsa, Pleven Province

Varbitsa (Bulgarian: Върбица [vɐrˈbit͡sɐ]) is a village in northern Bulgaria, part of Pleven Province, Pleven Municipality, 13 km north-east from Pleven city.

As per the census of 1st of February 2011, the village has a population of 530 inhabitants.
