= Verbic =

Verbič or Verbić is a South Slavic surname.

- Benjamin Verbič (born 1993), Slovenian professional footballer
- Silva Verbič (born 2002), Slovenian Nordic combined athlete and ski jumper
- Srđan Verbić (born 1970), Serbian physicist and statesman
