= Vrbica, Žepče =

Vrbica
- Village
- Location within Bosnia and Herzegovina
- Coordinates: 44.4610429°N 18.1090037°E
- Country: Bosnia and Herzegovina
- Entity: Federation of Bosnia and Herzegovina
- Canton: Zenica-Doboj
- Municipality: Žepče

Area
  - Total: 1.97 sq mi (5.10 km^{2})

Population (2013)
  - Total: 400
  - Density: 200/sq mi (78/km^{2})
- Time zone: UTC+1 (CET)
  - Summer (DST): UTC+2 (CEST)

Vrbica is a village in the municipality of Žepče, Bosnia and Herzegovina.

== Demographics ==
According to the 2013 census, its population was 400.

Ethnicity in 2013
Ethnicity	Number	Percentage
Croats	244	61.0%
Bosniaks	154	38.5%
other/undeclared	2	0.5%
Total	400	100%
