= Ostren =

Ostren Острени
- Administrative unit
- Location within Albania
- Coordinates: 41°25′N 20°28′E
- Country: Albania
- County: Dibër
- Municipality: Bulqizë

Population (2011)
  - Administrative unit: 3,034
- Time zone: UTC+1 (CET)
  - Summer (DST): UTC+2 (CEST)

Ostren (Macedonian: Острени/Ostreni) is a former municipality in the Dibër County, eastern Albania. At the 2015 local government reform it became a subdivision of the municipality Bulqizë. The population at the 2011 census was 3,034. It consists of 13 villages.

== Education ==
Macedonian language courses operate in Ostren to cater for the villages in which Macedonian-speakers form a majority.

== History ==
Ostren is locally known for the activist Sadik Elez Koçi, who participated in different important Albanian meetings like the Congress of Manastir and created warbands during the Albanian rebellions, firstly against the Ottoman Empire and then against Bulgaria during the World War I.

In 1900, Vasil Kanchov gathered and compiled statistics on demographics in the area and reported that Ostren i Madh was inhabited by 500 Bulgarian Muslims and 30 Bulgarian Christians, while Ostren i Vogël was inhabited by 400 Bulgarian Muslims and 78 Bulgarian Christians. Of the surrounding villages, Lladomëricë, Radovesh and Tërbaç were entirely Bulgarian Muslim, Tuçep was mainly Bulgarian Muslim and Pasinkë was mainly Albanian Muslim, while the other villages of the modern municipality were located too far West to be included in Kanchov's statistics.

In 2020, an ethnic Macedonian was elected as an administrator of Ostren.

== Demographics ==
Villages located in the Ostren administrative unit contain the following populations: Lejçan, Lladomericë and Tuçep are inhabited solely by a Torbeš population; Radovesh, Kojavec, Orzhanovë are inhabited solely by a Slavic speaking population which contain Torbeš. Okshtun i Madh, Okshtun i Vogël are inhabited by an Albanian population, and Tërbaç has some Torbeš residing there while Pasinkë, Ostren i Madh and Ostren i Vogël are inhabited by an Albanian population that dominates demographically in the villages that also contain significant populations of Torbeš and Orthodox Macedonians. The Torbeš and Orthodox Macedonian population of the area are speakers of a south Slavic language (Macedonian). The village of Oreshnjë is also part of the administrative unit. Haxhi Pirushi, president of the association "Prosperitet Gollo Borda" works on preserving the traditions of the Bulgarian minority in Albania. He claims that 23 out of 27 villages speak originally Bulgarian (Ostren included) or an old Bulgarian Slavic language and 17 of these villages are completely Bulgarian, while the others are mixed. On 22 October 1922 a Consulate was opened between Albania and Bulgaria about the Gollobordo issue in order to connect the minority in Albania with the Bulgarian origins
