= Torbeši =

Ethno-religious group in the Balkans

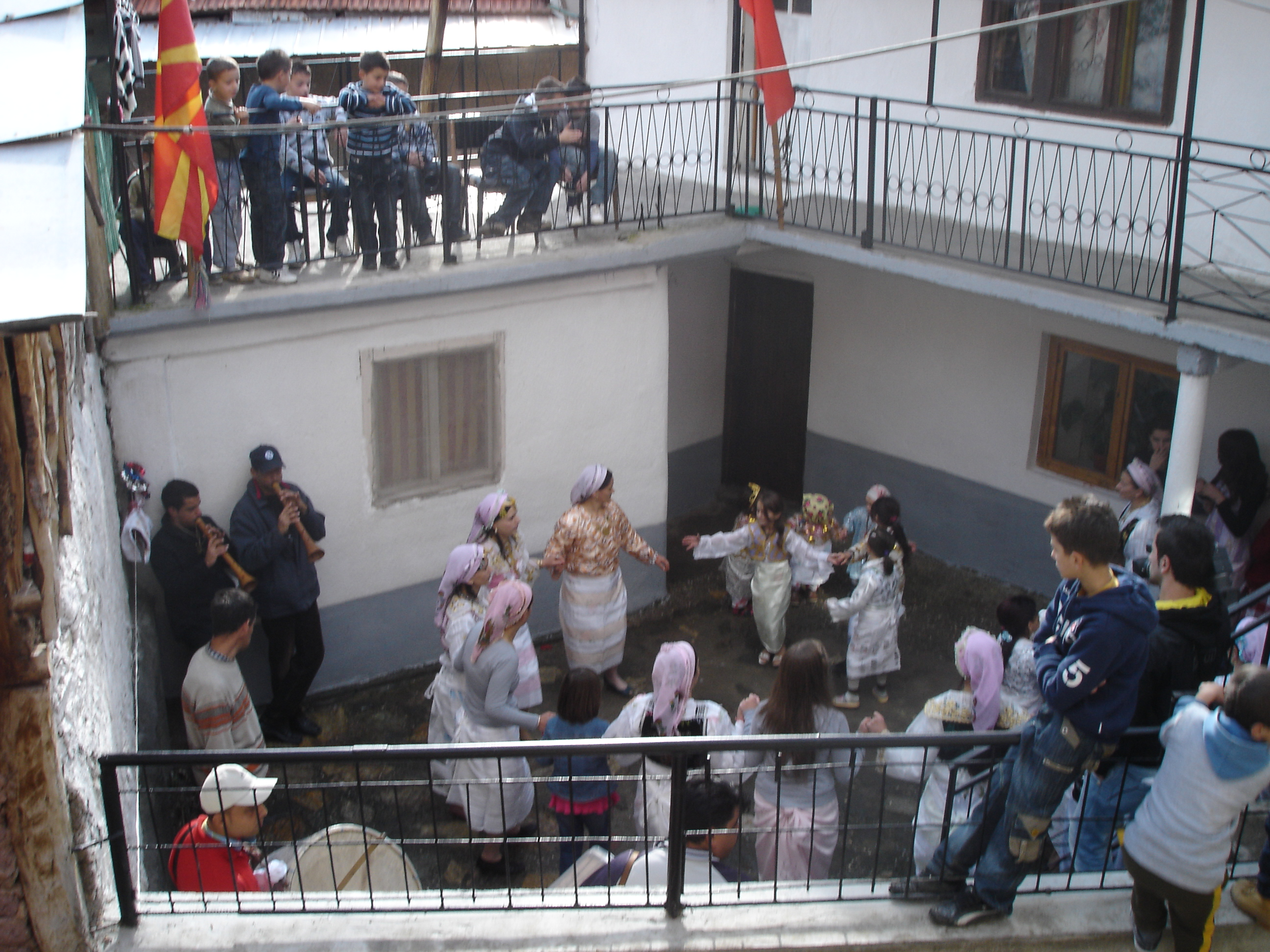
- Female folk dance of Torbeši in the village of Gorno Kosovrasti, near Debar

Total population
- 39,555 (1981); 5,816 (2021 census) (Note: 4,174 declared as Torbeš, 1,187 as Muslims and 455 as Muslim Macedonians)

Regions with significant populations
- Western North Macedonia, Torbešija, Eastern Albania

Languages
- Macedonian

Religion
- Sunni Islam

Related ethnic groups
- Macedonians, Pomaks, Gorani people, Macedonian Turks, Albanians

The Torbeši (Macedonian: Торбеши) are a Macedonian-speaking Muslim ethnoreligious group in North Macedonia and Albania. The Torbeši are also referred to as Macedonian Muslims (Macedonian: Македонци-муслимани, romanized: Makedonci-muslimani) or Muslim Macedonians. They have been religiously distinct from the Orthodox Christian Macedonian community for centuries, and are linguistically distinct from the larger Muslim ethnic groups in the greater region of Macedonia: the Albanians, Turks and Romanis. However, some Torbeši also still maintain a strong affiliation with Turkish identity and with Macedonian Turks. The regions inhabited by these Macedonian-speaking Muslims are Debarska Župa, Dolni Drimkol, Reka, and Golo Brdo (in Albania).

== Name ==
Many ethnonyms are used for the Macedonian-speaking Muslims. The most widespread ethnonym, which is also their endonym, is Torbeši. There are numerous theories on the origin of the term. Some link it to an old Slavic tribe Torbeachei, whereas other theories have suggested a derivation from the Persian torbekes meaning person with a bag. According to one theory, the Torbeši were a group of public servants in the Ottoman Empire tasked to carry bags (Turkish: torba oğlanları). Some scholars have linked the term with the kutugeri, a group of Bogomil missionaries who carried bags. The most common explanation in North Macedonia of the origin of the term is that the Torbeš sold their faith for a bag (torba in Macedonian) of goods from the Ottomans.

Among other names ascribed to them are Macedonian-speaking Muslims, Našinci, Apovci, Poturi and Turci (Turks). They are also referred to as Macedonian Muslims or Muslim Macedonians.

In some sources, Macedonian-speaking Muslims are grouped together with Pomaks and Gorani. The Macedonian-speaking Muslims of Gollobordë are also known as Gollobordas.

== Origins ==
The Torbeši are largely the descendants of Orthodox Christian Slavs from the region of Macedonia who were converted to Islam during the centuries when the Ottoman Empire ruled the Balkans. The various Sufi orders (like the Khalwati, Rifa'is and Qadiris) all played a role in the conversion of the Slavic and Paulician population.

Torbeši who identify as ethnic Macedonians claim to be "the truest Macedonians" who speak "clean Macedonian" and have maintained traditions and customs for centuries, unlike their Orthodox Macedonian counterparts.

== Geographic distribution ==
=== North Macedonia ===
The largest concentration of Torbeš can be found in western North Macedonia and eastern Albania. Most of the villages in Debar regions are populated by Torbeš. The Struga municipality also holds a large number of Macedonian Muslims who are primarily concentrated in the large village of Labuništa. Further north in the Debar region many of the surrounding villages are inhabited by Torbeš. The Dolna Reka region is also primarily populated by Torbeš. Places such as Rostuša and also have large Torbeš populations. There are also major concentrations in the central region of North Macedonia, surrounding the Plasnica municipality and the Dolneni municipality.

Torbešija is an ethnographic region in the Marko's River Valley south of Skopje, today within Studeničani Municipality. Torbeš began settling in the area in the second half of the 18th century. Beginning in the 20th century, many Torbeš left the area for Turkey or Skopje.

=== Albania ===
The Macedonian-speaking Muslim community of Gollobordë is known as Gollobordas and in Albania people from the community are considered Albanians instead of Macedonians, even by the Albanian state, and they are known to intermarry with Muslim Albanians and not with Orthodox Macedonians.

In the late 90s, Macedonian linguist Božidar Vidoeski conducted a study on the Macedonian speaking population of Albania. During that time, he notes the existence of a Torbeš population in Gollobordë, on the Macedonian-Albanian border, specifically in the villages of Vërnicë, Trebisht Lladomericë, Gjinovec, Klenjë, Lejçan, Lubalesh, Ostren i Madh and Ostren i Vogël, Okshtun, Pasinkë, Radovesh, Sebisht, Sërpetovë, Stebleve, Tuçep, Tërbaç. An Albanian population dominated in the northern Gollobordë villages of Sebishtë, Pasinkë, Vërnicë, Ostren i Madh and Ostren i Vogël.

=== Kosovo ===
According to political scientist Fred Cocozzelli the Bosniak community in Kosovo belong to the Macedonian Muslim community also known as "Torbesh".

=== Turkey ===
Along with other Balkan Muslims following the collapse of the Ottoman Empire, Torbeš were helped by the Turkish government to settle in Turkey. These groups were labelled as Turks and all claimed Turkish descent. In 1952, Yugoslavia and Turkey signed an agreement of free emigration that allowed Muslims from Yugoslavia to settle in Turkey. A total of 127,000 ethnic Turks, Torbeši, and other Muslims from Macedonia migrated.

== Demographics ==
The exact numbers of Torbeš are not easy to establish. The historian Ivo Banac estimates that in the old Kingdom of Yugoslavia, before World War II, the Torbeš population stood at around 27,000. Subsequent censuses have produced dramatically varying figures: 1,591 in 1953, 3,002 in 1961, 1,248 in 1971 and 39,355 in 1981. Commentators have suggested that the latter figure includes many who previously identified themselves as Turks. Meanwhile, the Association of Macedonian Muslims has claimed that since World War II more than 70,000 Macedonian Muslims have been assimilated by other Muslim groups, most notably the Albanians.

=== Ethnic affiliation ===
During censuses, Macedonian Muslims' ethnic identity varies. While some declare as ethnic Macedonians, some declare as Turks or Albanians despite not speaking Turkish or Albanian. Others declare as Bosniaks or Gorani, with some declaring as Torbeš, Muslim Macedonians or Muslims.

There are some tensions with the Macedonian Christian community over the widespread association between Macedonian national identity and adherence to the Macedonian Orthodox Church.

Identity for Macedonian Muslims is often tied to a belonging to their respective villages/localities.

In Yugoslavia, Slavic-speaking Muslims were allowed to register themselves for the first time as a separate ethnic group. This new form of identification was mostly used by Bosniaks, but also spread as a choice in Macedonia, where in 30,000-40,000 individuals identified themselves as Muslims in 1981 and 1991. This number dropped to ~14,000 in 1994. In the 2002 census, many Torbeši identified themselves with ethnic groups of their Muslim co-religionists: Albanians and Turks. The 2021 North Macedonia census was the first to have a separate ethnic category for Torbeši; a total of 4,174 individuals in the country identified as such and a further 455 identified as "Muslim Macedonians". However, data at the municipal and settlement levels is not available for these groups. There were also 1,187 individuals who declared as Muslims. Other Torbeši identified themselves as Turks, Albanians, and Bosniaks.

In municipalities containing the largest concentrations of Torbeš villages, the 2021 census results were as follows for individuals who participated in the census:

Municipality	Muslim (%)	Macedonian mother tongue (%)	Ethnic affiliations
Centar Župa	99.4	28.6	Turk: 86.1%; Macedonian: 7.0%; Albanian 5.6%; Other 1.2%
Debar	97.9	32.1	Albanian: 60.7%; Turk: 19.7%; Macedonian: 8.3%; Other 3.1%
Mavrovo and Rostuša	79.2	88.9	Turk: 33.7%; Macedonian: 31.9%; Other: 23.2%; Albanian: 10.2%
Plasnica	97.4%	0.30% (as declared in the census)	Turk: 97.13%; Macedonian: 0.23%; Other: 0%; Albanian: 0.31%
Struga	67.9	46.7	Albanian: 54.4%; Macedonian: 31.4%; Turk: 7.3%; Other: 5.1%

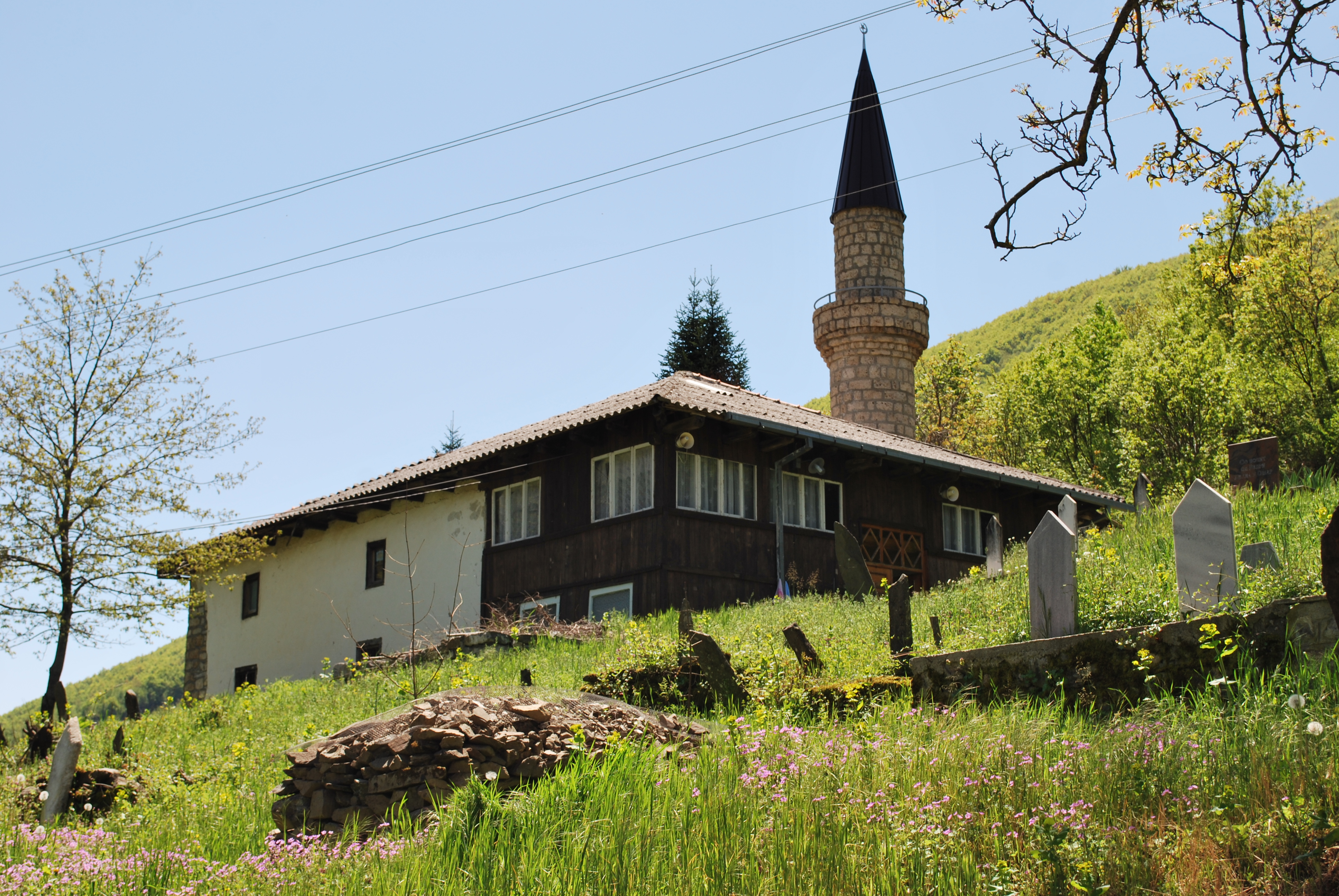
The Old Mosque of Rostuša

== Culture ==
The oldest Macedonian newspaper Nova Makedonija was first published in 1944 in Gorno Vranovci, a village that was inhabited by Torbeši at the time.

Interethnic marriages are considered acceptable among Macedonian Muslims, whereas interreligious ones are not, though families are most likely to prefer marriage with those from within the nearby villages. Arranged marriage, common in the past, is now rare.

The Torbeš consider their local cuisine to be "Macedonian cuisine", while it shares commonalities with neighboring Muslim groups such as dishes for weddings and religious holidays.

Torbeš women's bridal makeup in Gorna Župa. "Gelina" ritual.

== Political activities ==
The principal outlet for Macedonian Muslim political activities has been the Association of Macedonian Muslims. It was established in 1970 with the support of the authorities, probably as a means of keeping Macedonian Muslim aspirations in control.

Led by member of parliament Fiat Canoski, "organizations of Macedonians of Islamic religion… declared themselves as Torbeshi". At the First Torbesh Forum, they adopted the "Torbesh Charter" and demanded separate inclusion in the preamble of the Constitution of the Republic of Macedonia.

A controversy broke out in 1995 when the Albanian-dominated Meshihat or council of the Islamic community in North Macedonia declared that Albanian was the official language of Muslims in Macedonia. The decision prompted protests from the leaders and members of the Macedonian Muslim community.

== Notable people ==
- Fejzo Dželadinovski, Macedonian Army soldier who was killed during the 2001 conflict in Macedonia, he was the only Macedonian Muslim to be killed in the conflict.
- Jašar Ahmedovski, Macedonian and Serbian singer.
- Ipče Ahmedovski, Macedonian and Serbian singer.
- Jakub Selimoski, Macedonian Islamic scholar and cleric who served as Grand Mufti of Yugoslavia from 1991 to 1993.
- Arif Ramadani, Islamic theologian, outstanding translator from Arabic to Macedonian with over 60 books translated and written so far.
- Aki Rahimovski, Croatian singer
- Amel Rustemoski, Macedonian footballer.
- Emir Saitoski, Macedonian footballer.
- Menil Velioski, Macedonian singer
- Semih Kaya, former Turkish footballer; his grandfather is a Torbeš
- Edin Nuredinoski, Macedonian footballer.
- Velija Ramkovski, Macedonian politician and businessman
- Nijazi Limanoski, Macedonian ethnologist and fighter for the national unification of Macedonians regardless of religious affiliation (1941–1997)
- Same Limani–Žarnoski, Macedonian poet and fighter for the national unification of the Macedonians (1935–2007)
- Selmin Sakiri–Sakirovski, Austro-Macedonian engineer, author, and politician.
- Hajan Selmani, Macedonian entrepreneur (1985–2019)
- Kimet Fetahu, Albanian–Macedonian minority rights activist.
- Tasim Sulejmanoski — Macedonian politician.
- Adem Sulejmanoski — Macedonian painter and mosaicist.

== See also ==
- Macedonians (ethnic group)
- Muslim Bulgarians and Pomaks
- Gorani
- Islam in North Macedonia

== Sources ==
- Cacanoska, Ružica (2015), "Religious Polarization of Macedonian Modern Society", in Branislav Radeljić; Martina Topić (eds.), Religion in the Post-Yugoslav Context, Lexington Books, pp. 121–154, ISBN 9781498522472.
- Cocozzelli, Fred (2016), "Ethnic Minorities and Politics in Kosovo", in Sabrina P. Ramet; Marko Valenta (eds.), Ethnic Minorities and Politics in Post-Socialist Southeastern Europe, Cambridge University Press, ISBN 9781107159129.
- Damjanovski, Ivan (2021), "Old Communities and New Controversies: the community of Macedonian-speaking Muslims between ethnicity and religion", Political Thought, 62: 23–44.
- Perry, Duncan M. (1997), "The Republic of Macedonia: finding its way", in Karen Dawisha; Bruce Parrott (eds.), Politics, Power and the Struggle for Democracy in South-East Europe, Cambridge University Press, ISBN 9780521597333.
- Pettifer, James (1999), The New Macedonian Question, Macmillan Press Ltd, ISBN 9780230535794.
- Poulton, Hugh (1997), "Changing Notions of National Identity among Muslims", in Hugh Poulton; Suha Taji-Farouki (eds.), Muslim Identity and the Balkan States, C. Hurst & Co, ISBN 9781850653486.
- Poulton, Hugh (2000), Who Are the Macedonians?, Hurst & Company, London, ISBN 9781850655343.
- Zadrożna, Anna (2013), "'I am Muslim but I am the European One': Contextual Identities among Muslims from Western Macedonia in Everyday Practices and Narratives.", Anthropological Journal of European Cultures, 22 (2): 35–52, doi:10.3167/ajec.2013.220203.
