= Trebisht =

Trebisht Требишта
- Administrative unit
- Location within Albania
- Coordinates: 41°25′N 20°32′E
- Country: Albania
- County: Dibër
- Municipality: Bulqizë

Population (2011)
  - Administrative unit: 993
- Time zone: UTC+1 (CET)
  - Summer (DST): UTC+2 (CEST)

Trebisht (Macedonian: Требишта, Bulgarian: Требище or Требища) is a former municipality in the Dibër County, eastern Albania. At the 2015 local government reform it became a subdivision of the municipality Bulqizë. The population at the 2011 census was 993.

== Geography ==
The village is situated in the geographical area of Gollobordë.

Within the municipality, the village of Trebisht consists of the three neighborhoods of Trebisht-Muçinë, Trebisht-Balaj, and Trebisht-Çelebi. (in the local Macedonian dialect - Dunomala, Gurnomala and Unomala). These neighborhoods are divided into smaller ones.

== Demographic history ==
A demographic study published in 1878, reflecting statistics of the male population from 1873, stated that the population of Trébichta consisted of 150 households with 144 Bulgarian Christians and 265 Pomaks.

In the early 20th century, Trebisht was a village with a mixed population of Bulgarian Muslims and Bulgarian Christians, according to Bulgarian geographer Vasil Kanchov's statistics. The Muslim population was prevalent, with 2500 Bulgarian Muslims reported and 70 Bulgarian Christians—97.3% Muslim and 2.7% Christian.

Villages located in the Trebisht administrative unit contain the following populations: Gjinovec and Klenjë are inhabited solely by a Slavic speaking population which contain Torbeš or Muslim Bulgarians. Vërnicë is inhabited by an Albanian population that dominates demographically in the village that also contains a significant population of Slavic Speakers Torbeš and Orthodox Macedonians or Bulgarians). The Torbeš and Orthodox Macedonian population of the area are speakers of a south Slavic language (Macedonian or Bulgarian).

The inhabitants of Trebisht are speakers of a south Slavic dialect and the village has traditionally consisted of a mixed Slavic Orthodox Christian (Macedonian or Bulgarian) and Torbeš or Bulgarian Muslim) population. Within Macedonian academia, the language spoken has been regarded as Macedonian, while within Bulgarian academia, the dialect of Trebisht is considered as part of the Bulgarian language. The local population of the village lack official recognition as a Macedonian minority from the Albanian government. In 2020, an ethnic Macedonian was elected as an administrator of Trebisht.

== Notable people ==
- Kimet Fetahu, academic and activist
- Nexhmedin Zajmi, painter and sculptor.
