= Gollobordë =

Geographical region in Albania and North Macedonia

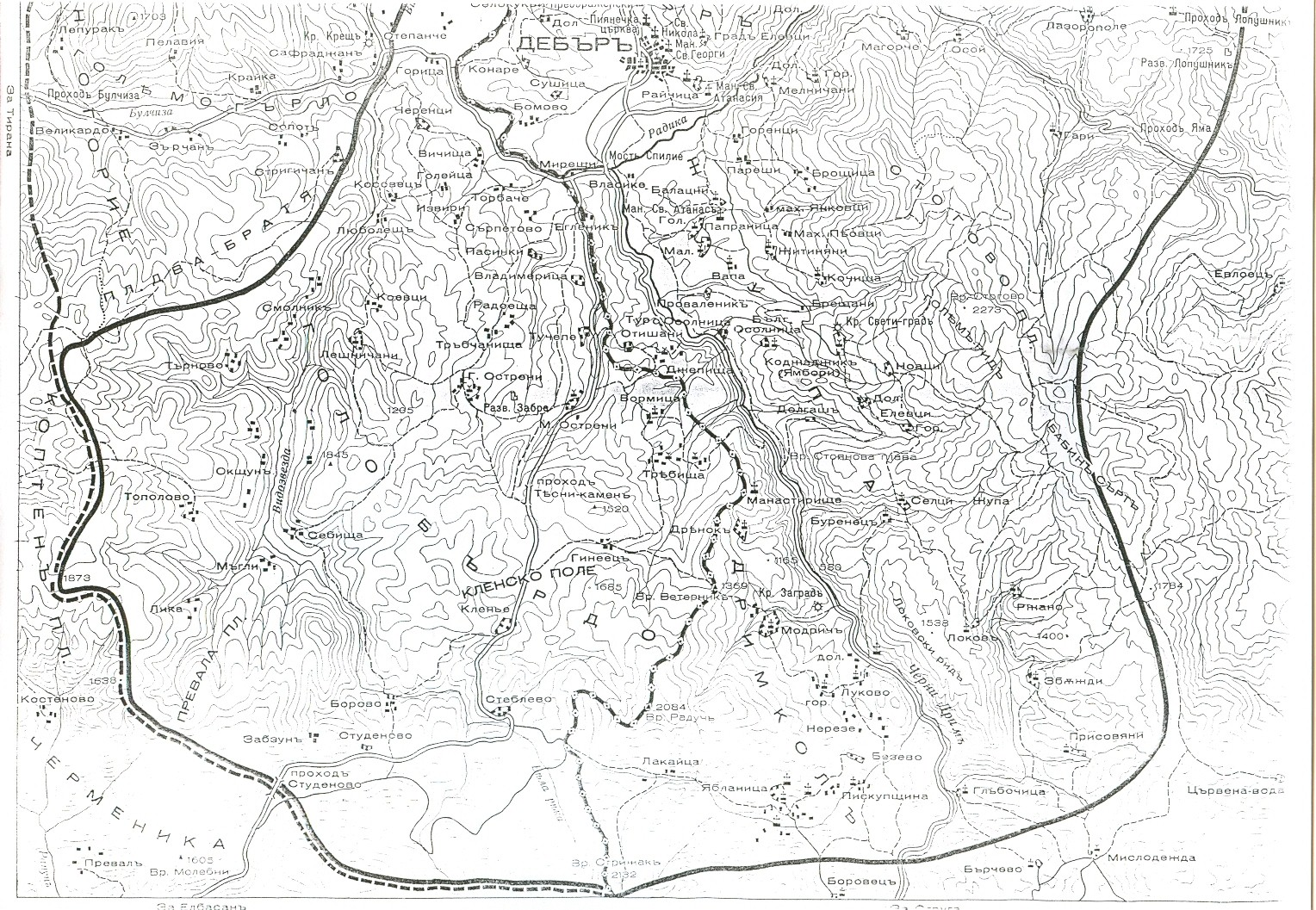
Map of Gollobordë and Dibër.

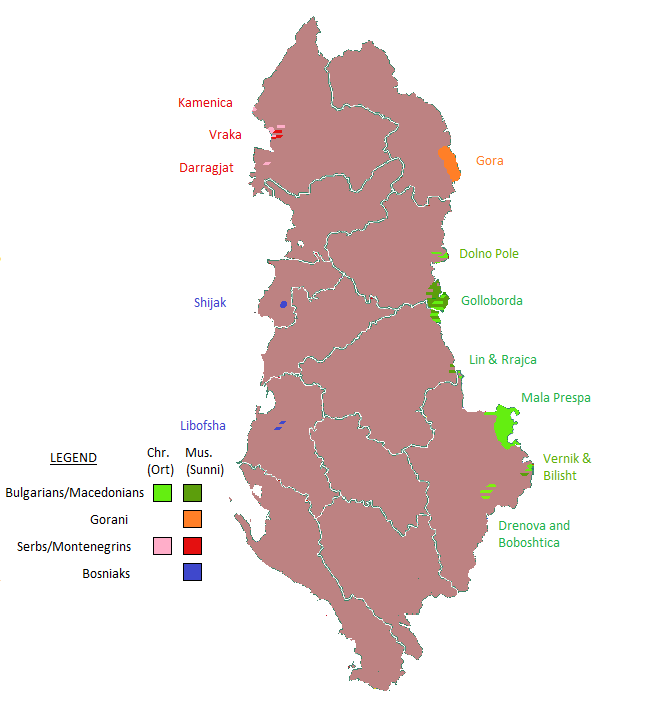
Historical location of Slavic groups that inhabited Albania in the early 20th century.

Gollobordë (Albanian definite form: Golloborda or Kalabardha; Bulgarian: Голо Бърдо, romanized: Golo Bărdo; Macedonian: Голо Брдо, romanized: Golo Brdo) refers to a geographical area of traditionally 24 villages of which 18 are situated primarily in eastern Albania, with a small portion consisting of six villages lying within North Macedonia. This region is located within the Dibër and Elbasan counties which contain Bulgarian, Macedonian and Albanian villages.

This region, like neighboring regions, has historically been economically linked to the city of Debar, which was traditionally referred to by inhabitants as simply "the City" or "Shehr".

== History ==
=== Ottoman period ===
The Islamization process is held to have occurred in Golloborda relatively late in Ottoman times. In 1519, the region was still entirely Christian. Some authors have held that the Islamization process in Golloborda to have occurred in the late 18th century, whereas others asserted that the impetus to mass Islamization in the region was the bedel tax, imposed only on Christians because they were not drafted and initiated in the region in the year 1832. According to this second theory, this tax was particularly harsh and caused many families to turn to Islam as a means of avoiding it. During the same period, a mass emigration process occurred, and many Muslim families settled elsewhere, including in Debar, in Struga's Drimkol region, and in Thessaloniki. The families that settled in Debar are from the surrounding areas and retain their origins which are denoted by their last names, including Klenjë, Trebisht, Ostreni, Torbaç, and others.

=== Early 20th century ===
In 1913, the majority of the region was awarded to Albania while six villages were assigned to the Kingdom of Serbs, Croats and Slovenes. However, despite the border that divided the region in pieces, the region remained culturally and economically unified at this time, and Debar served as the unifying point for the entire region. There were plenty of migratory movements across the border during this period, and during King Zogu's reign, people on both sides of the Albanian-Yugoslav border running through the region would cross it to cultivate farmland on the other side. During this period, the official border changed a number of times—at one point, it ran between Klenja and Stebleva, but now these two towns are both in Albania.

=== Under Communism ===
The fates of the two sides of the region diverged much more sharply after the rise of communism in the aftermath of World War II. In 1948, the regime of Enver Hoxha in Albania closed down the border, and a barbed wire fence was erected on the border, accompanied by guard posts. The Albanian communist state was extremely suspicious of Gollobordian communities, a fact one Macedonian author attributed to their "weak Albanian patriotism". This new heavy enforcement of the border caused many people to lose contact with their relatives who lived on the other side.

== Demographics ==
Both Muslims and Christians today live in harmony and celebrate the holidays of both faiths together. Bulgarian ethnologist Veselka Toncheva believes that this phenomenon, seen elsewhere in post-communist Albania, cannot be attributed solely to the anti-religious policies of communist leader Enver Hoxha, but also due to the perception of local communities as whole units of which local Christians and local Muslims both are part.

=== Albania ===
In the region of Gollobordë, villages located on the Albanian side of the border have the following population demographics:

Trebisht administrative unit: Gjinovec and Klenjë are inhabited by a Slavic speaking population which contain Torbeš or Pomaks. Vërnicë is inhabited by an Albanian population that dominates demographically in the village, and also contains a significant population of Torbeš and Orthodox Macedonians. Trebisht is traditionally inhabited by a mixed Orthodox Macedonian/Bulgarian and Torbeš/Pomak population.

Ostren administrative unit: Lejçan, Lladomericë and Tuçep are inhabited by Torbeš/Pomaks; Radovesh, Kojavec, Orzhanovë are inhabited by a Slavic speaking population which contain Torbeš/Pomaks. Okshtun i Madh, Okshtun i Vogël and Tërbaç have some Torbeš/Pomaks residing there while Pasinkë, Ostren i Madh and Ostren i Vogël are inhabited by an Albanian population that dominates demographically in the villages that also contain significant populations of Torbeš/Pomaks and Orthodox Macedonians/Bulgarians.

The villages of Zabzun, Borovë, Llangë, Moglicë, Prodan are located in the Stëblevë administrative unit and two villages are inhabited by Slavic populations: Stëblevë, which is inhabited by a Slavic speaking population that contains Torbeš. Sebisht is inhabited by an Albanian population that dominates demographically in the village and contains three families from the Torbeš/Pomak and Orthodox Macedonian/Bulgarian population.

Gjoricë administrative unit: Lubalesh has some Torbeš living in the village.

The Torbeš/Pomak and Orthodox Bulgarian/Macedonian population of Gollobordë are speakers of a South Slavic language (Macedonian or Bulgarian). The Muslim Macedonian speaking community of the area is known as Gollobordas and in Albania people from the community are considered Albanians instead of Macedonians, even by the Albanian state, and they are known to intermarry with Muslim Albanians and not with Orthodox Macedonians. Until the 1990s the local Orthodox Macedonian minority, who have since migrated, used to live in some villages alongside the Gollobordas, who today number some roughly 3,000 people.

=== North Macedonia ===
In the region of Gollobordë, villages located in North Macedonia have the following population demographics:

Debar Municipality: Otišani has traditionally been inhabited by a Torbeš population and Džepište has traditionally been inhabited by Orthodox Macedonians and a Torbeš population.

Struga Municipality: Manastirec, Drenok, Modrič and Lakaica are inhabited by Orthodox Macedonians.

== Identity of the local Slavic-speakers ==
The local Slavs' ethno-linguistic identity is an issue of debate. According to the findings of Aleksander Novik and his team in 2008-10, the identity of the local Slavs is largely determined by their religious backgrounds and their native language. Novik's team recorded four main options for self-identifications among the Slavs: Makedonci, Muslimane, Turci, and Naši. Intrinsically linked to the first form of identification, many of the local Slavs (Muslim or Orthodox Christian) acknowledge a connection to the neighbouring Macedonians. However, the Muslims clearly distinguish themselves from their Orthodox brethren through the usage of the ethnonyms Muslimane and Turci, the latter of which harks back to issues of ethnic and religious identity in the Ottoman millet system. Both religious groups commonly use the ethnonym Naši (lit. "ours") to distinguish themselves from the region's native Albanian-speaking population. The Bulgarian identity was very rarely used in Golloborda according to the team's findings. The majority of the Slavs (particularly those of Muslim faith) are bilingual in their native tongue and Albanian, although the older generation have a very poor understanding of Albanian.

== Identity and dialects of the local Albanians ==
The local Albanians are concentrated in the western and south-western extremes of Golloborda and are to be found in the villages of Okshtuni i Madh, Okshtuni i Vogël, Oreshnja, Tërbaçi, Zabzuni, Borova, Sebishti, and Llanga. However, due to the uncertain and fluid borders of the region, villages on the periphery such as Zerqani are also often included by locals. In their expedition of 2008, Alexander Rusakov and his team noted that the locals of Borova did not consider themselves to be a part of Golloborda as they associated the region only with the Slavic-speakers and their villages. The team also noted that there was no clear dialectal uniformity among the Albanians. The dialect of Borova demonstrated a number of characteristics typical of the Southern Geg dialects, while also showing some influence from Central Geg which was attributed to historical migrations into the village from regions such as Mati. On the other hand, the Albanian spoken in Okshtuni and Tërbaçi were more typical of Central Geg despite the former showing some influences from Southern Geg.

== See also ==
- Bulgarians in Albania
- Macedonians in Albania
- Mala Prespa
