= Bulqizë =

Municipality in Albania

- Municipality and town
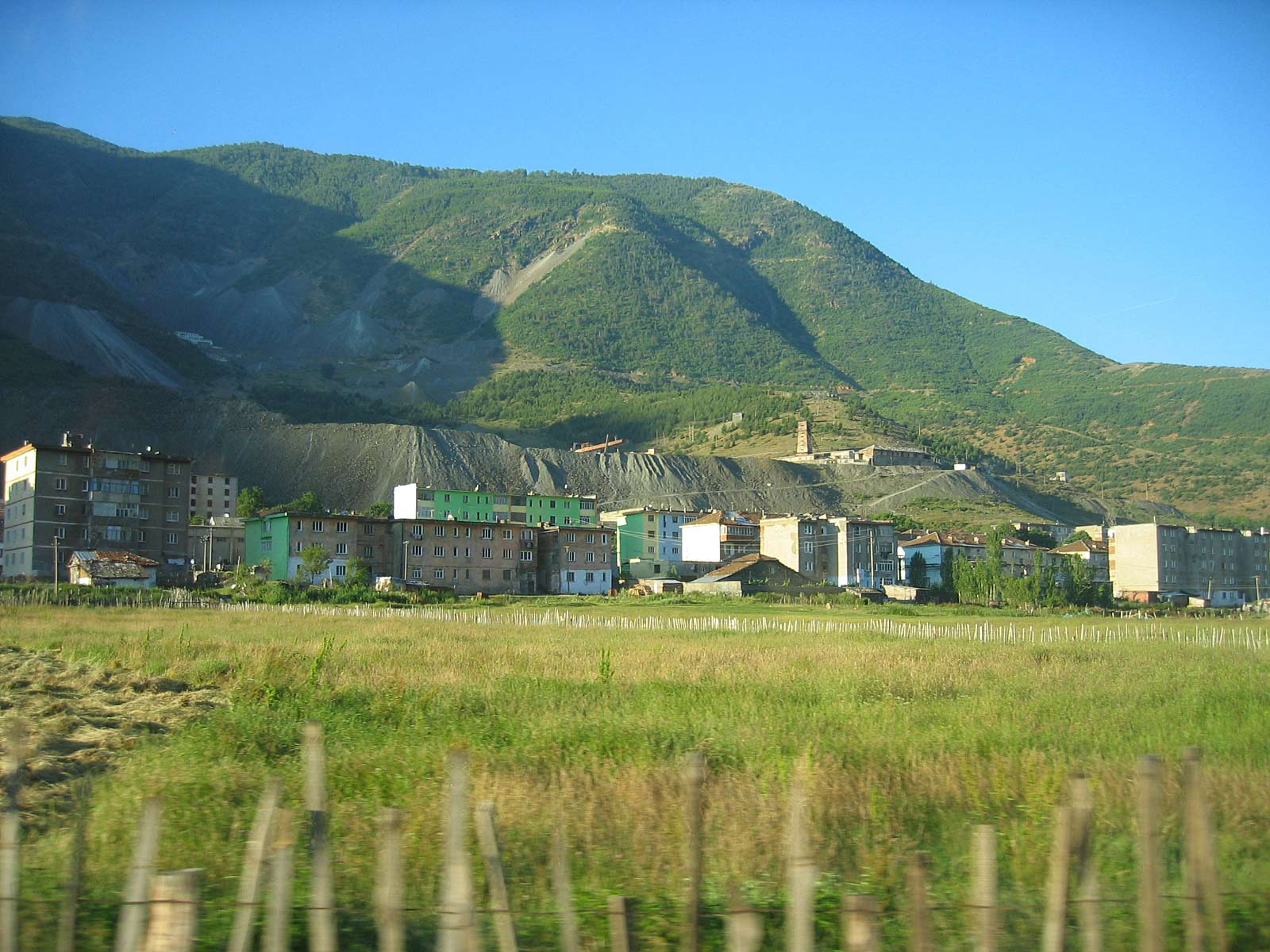
- View of Bulqizë

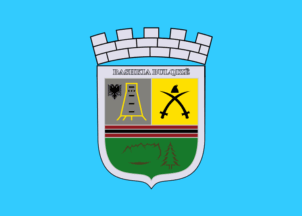
- Flag Seal

- Location within Albania Location within Europe
- Coordinates: 41°29′N 20°13′E
- Country: Albania
- Region: Northern Albania
- County: Dibër

Government
  - Type: Mayor–council
  - Mayor: Festime Mjeshtri (PS)
  - Council: Bulqizë Municipal Council

Area
  - Municipality: 678.51 km^{2} (261.97 sq mi)
- Elevation: 740 m (2,430 ft)

Population (2023)
  - Municipality: 26,826 (Note: The municipality of Bulqizë consists of the administrative units of Fushë-Bulqizë, Gjoricë, Martanesh, Ostren, Shupenzë, Trebisht, Zerqan and Bulqizë. The population of the municipality results from the sum of the listed administrative units in the former as of the 2011 Albanian census.)
  - Municipality density: 59.28/km^{2} (153.5/sq mi)
  - Administrative unit: 7,875
- Time zone: UTC+1 (CET)
  - Summer (DST): UTC+2 (CEST)
- Postal code: 8401-8407
- Area code: (0)219
- Website: bulqiza.gov.al

Bulqizë (Albanian: [ˈbulˈcizə]; Albanian definite form: Bulqiza) is a municipality in Dibër County, northeastern Albania. The municipality consists of the administrative units of Fushë-Bulqizë, Gjoricë, Martanesh, Ostren, Shupenzë, Trebisht, Zerqan with Bulqizë constituting its seat. As of the 2023 census, there were 7,875 people residing in Bulqizë and 26,826 in Bulqizë Municipality.

== Demographic history ==
Historical population
Year	Pop.	±%
1989	8,712	—
2001	10,454	+20.0%
2011	8,177	−21.8%
2023	7,875	−3.7%

Bulqizë is recorded in the Ottoman defter of 1467 as a hass-ı mir-liva and derbendci settlement in the vilayet of Dulgoberda. Although the register's complete survey on the village is missing, the following household heads are attested: Dimitri Bogdani, Kolë Sharqini, Gjin Kimeza, Gjin Kolandi, Nikolla Budi, Martin Bardi, Progon Buljani, Maqe Kimëza, Istvan Nenada, Progon Bogdani, Dimitri, Todor Damëza, Banek Alakasa, Nikolla Mesina, Budi, Gjergj Garuja, and Gjergj Iglat (from i gjatë, "the tall").

== Geography ==
Bulqizë lies in the lower north-east of Albania adjacent to the border with North Macedonia. The municipalities of Mat and Tirana lie to the west while at the south is the municipality of Librazhd. There are significant sources of chromite (a chromium ore) mined there since the 1980s, which supports most of the economy of the area. The Bulqizë mine has experienced several gas explosions since 1992 – including one with fatalities – recently likely attributed to seeps of natural hydrogen possibly formed from ophiolites and trapped within a faulted reservoir.
