= Debar Municipality =

Municipality of North Macedonia

Coordinates: 41.52°N 20.53°E

Municipality of Debar Општина Дебар Komuna e Dibrës
- Urban municipality
- Coat of arms

- Country: North Macedonia
- Region: Southwestern
- Municipal seat: Debar

Government
  - Mayor: Fisnik Mela (VLEN)

Area
  - Total: 145.67 km^{2} (56.24 sq mi)

Population
  - Total: 15,412
  - Density: 134.15/km^{2} (347.4/sq mi)
- Time zone: UTC+1 (CET)
- Area code: +389 46
- Vehicle registration: DB
- Website: Official Website

Debar (Macedonian: Општина Дебар [ˈdɛːbar], Albanian: Komuna e Dibrës) is a municipality in western part of Republic of North Macedonia. Debar is also the name of the town where the municipal seat is found. Debar Municipality is part of the Southwestern Statistical Region.

== Geography ==
The municipality borders Mavrovo and Rostuša Municipality to the northeast, Kičevo Municipality to the southeast, Centar Župa Municipality to the south, and Albania to the west.

== Demographics ==
According to the 2021 North Macedonia census, this municipality has 15,412 inhabitants.

Ethnic groups in the municipality include:

	2002		2021	
	Number	%	Number	%
TOTAL	19,542	100	15,412	100
Albanians	11,348	58.07	8,438	54.75
Turks	2,684	13.74	2,733	17.73
Macedonians	3,911	20.01	1,155	7.49
Roma	1,080	5.53	1,140	7.4
Bosniaks	3	0.02	8	0.05
Serbs	22	0.11	5	0.03
Vlachs	2	0.01	2	0.01
Other / Undeclared / Unknown	492	2.52	432	2.81
Persons for whom data are taken from administrative sources			1,499	9.73

Mother tongues in Debar Municipality include:

- Albanian: 9,232 (59.9%)
- Macedonian: 4,466 (29.0%)
- Turkish: 189 (1.2%)
- Others: 26 (0.1%)
- Persons for whom data are taken from administrative sources: 1,499 (9.7%)

Demographic development of Debar municipality within today borders.

Census year	Total	Macedonians	%	Albanians	%	Turks	%	Roma	%	Vlachs	Serbs	Bosniaks	Other	Persons for whom data are taken from administrative sources
1953	10,258	3,392	33.07	5,819	56.73	776	7.56	83	0.81	2	114	0	72	/
1961	11,162	2,025	18.14	6,476	58.02	2,002	17.94	0	0.00	0	86	0	573	/
1971	13,802	2,022	14.65	8,793	63.71	2,414	17.49	0	0.00	0	106	0	467	/
1981	16,952	2,358	13.91	9,981	58.88	1,130	6.67	1,030	6.08	0	37	0	2,416	/
1994	19,010	4,266	22.44	10,935	57.52	1,875	9.86	1,103	5.80	1	34	0	796	/
2002	19,542	3,911	20.02	11,348	58.09	2,684	13.74	1,080	5.53	2	22	3	492	/
2021	15,412	1,155	7.49	8,438	54.75	2,733	17.73	1,140	7.4	2	5	8	432	1,499
