= Zoran Jolevski =

Former Macedonian Ambassador to the US

His Excellency Zoran Jolevski Зоран Јолевски
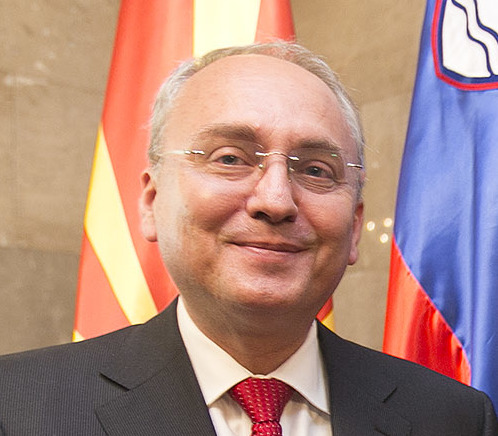
- Jolevski in 2016

Minister of Defence of North Macedonia
- In office 19 June 2014 – 1 June 2017
- President: Gjorge Ivanov
- Premier: Nikola Gruevski
- Preceded by: Talat Xhaferi
- Succeeded by: Radmila Šekerinska

Macedonian negotiator of the Macedonia name dispute
- In office 30 November 2008 – 1 June 2014
- President: Branko Crvenkovski; Gjorge Ivanov
- Premier: Nikola Gruevski
- Preceded by: Nikola Dimitrov

Macedonian Ambassador to the United States
- In office 22 March 2007 – 19 June 2014
- President: Branko Crvenkovski; Gjorge Ivanov
- Premier: Nikola Gruevski
- Preceded by: Ljupčo Jordanovski
- Succeeded by: Vasko Naumovski

1st Macedonian ambassador to Mexico
- In office 21 January 2011 – 19 June 2014
- President: Gjorge Ivanov
- Premier: Nikola Gruevski

1st Permanent Representative at the Organization of American States
- In office 18 May 2011 – 19 June 2014
- President: Gjorge Ivanov
- Premier: Nikola Gruevski
- Secretary General: José Miguel Insulza

Secretary General of the President of North Macedonia (Chief of Staff)
- In office 19 November 1999 – 26 February 2004
- President: Boris Trajkovski
- Preceded by: Position established
- Succeeded by: Natasa Savova

Personal details
- Born: 16 July 1959 (age 67) Skopje, Socialist Republic of Macedonia, SFR Yugoslavia (now North Macedonia)
- Party: VMRO-DPMNE
- Spouse: Suzana Jolevska
- Education: Ss. Cyril and Methodius University in Skopje, BA, PhD; Institute of Social Studies, Erasmus University Rotterdam, MA

Zoran Jolevski (Macedonian: Зоран Јолевски; born 16 July 1959) is a Macedonian diplomat and the former minister of defence of then Republic of Macedonia (now North Macedonia). Prior to his appointment as Minister of Defence, he served as Macedonia's ambassador to the United States of America. In November 2008, he was appointed chief negotiator to the Macedonia naming dispute, and in 2011 he was appointed Ambassador to the United Mexican States and as Permanent Representative to the Organization of American States. He served as Secretary General of the late Macedonian president Boris Trajkovski from 2000–2004. He holds a Ph.D. in International Economy from Ss. Cyril and Methodius University of Skopje. He is married to Suzana Jolevska, and together they have two sons, Pero (1988) and Filip (1992).

== Early life and education ==
Jolevski was born in Skopje, Yugoslavia. He attended Orce Nikolov High School in Skopje, along with his best friends - opera singer Boris Trajanov and movie director Milcho Manchevski. While in high school, he was the captain of the swimming team and junior champion in SR Macedonia. After graduating in 1978, he studied at the Faculty of Economics at Ss. Cyril and Methodius University of Skopje. He graduated summa cum laude with a bachelor's degree in economics. While in high school and university, he taught and tutored mathematics. In 1990, Zoran Jolevski received a Master of Science in Law from the Faculty of Law Justinian I at Ss. Cyril and Methodius University of Skopje, and defended the thesis "Business Strategies of Multinational Companies." Upon completing his graduate degree, he continued his studies at the International Institute of Social Studies, which is part of Erasmus University Rotterdam in The Hague, the Netherlands. At the Institute of Social Studies, he earned a postgraduate degree. In 1994, he attended the Trade Policy Course of the General Agreement on Tariffs and Trade (GATT). He holds a Ph.D. in International Economy from the Faculty of Economy at the Ss. Cyril and Methodius University of Skopje, on the thesis "Foreign Trade Regime of Macedonia and the WTO Agreements". He speaks English, French, Serbo-Croatian, Bulgarian and Macedonian.

== Personal life ==
Jolevski married Suzana Jolevska and they have two sons: Pero (1988), a Director at Blue Star Strategies, and Filip (1992), an economist at the World Bank Group.

== Early career ==
From 1983 to 1988, Jolevski owned and operated a travel agency, where he also served as a Freelance Tour Director. While he was preparing his Masters, he was a Member of the Presidency of Tourist Association of Skopje and Member of the Presidency of Swimming Club "Vardar.". He began his professional diplomatic career in 1988, joining the Ministry of Foreign Affairs.

== Professional career ==
=== Ministry of Foreign Affairs (1988–94) ===
From 1988 to 1992, Jolevski served in the Ministry of Foreign Affairs as the responsible officer for preparing all necessary documents for observer status of the country in the General Agreement on Tariffs and Trade. In addition, he served as the Desk Officer for the United Kingdom and Germany. From 1992 to 1994, Jolevski was the Secretary to the Delegation to the International Conference on Succession of the Former Yugoslavia, where he played an important role in the negotiations. While working at the Ministry, Jolevski became a Member of the Presidency of North Macedonia-Japanese Friendship Association.

=== Early diplomatic career (1994–98) ===
In October 1994, Jolevski became the First Secretary at the Permanent Mission of North Macedonia to the World Trade Organization (WTO) and the United Nations office at Geneva, Switzerland. While there he was the Vice-chairman of the United Nations Conference on Trade and Development Expert Meeting on Existing Regional and Multilateral Investment Treaties and their Development Dimensions. He was there until 1998, and after that he returned at the Ministry of Foreign Affairs.

=== Ministry of Foreign Affairs (1998–99) ===
After returning from Switzerland, Jolevski was the Secretary for WTO accession and other international trade and financial affairs. When the Kosovo War broke out, he served as the Deputy National Coordinator on Humanitarian Issues for the Kosovo refugee crises, where he worked with then-Deputy Minister of Foreign Affairs Boris Trajkovski, with whom he established a friendly and professional relationship. While in the Ministry, Jolevski continued his International involvement as a Member of Bureau of the Commission of UNCTAD on Investment, Technology and Related Financial Issues.

=== Secretary General of the President (1999–2004) ===
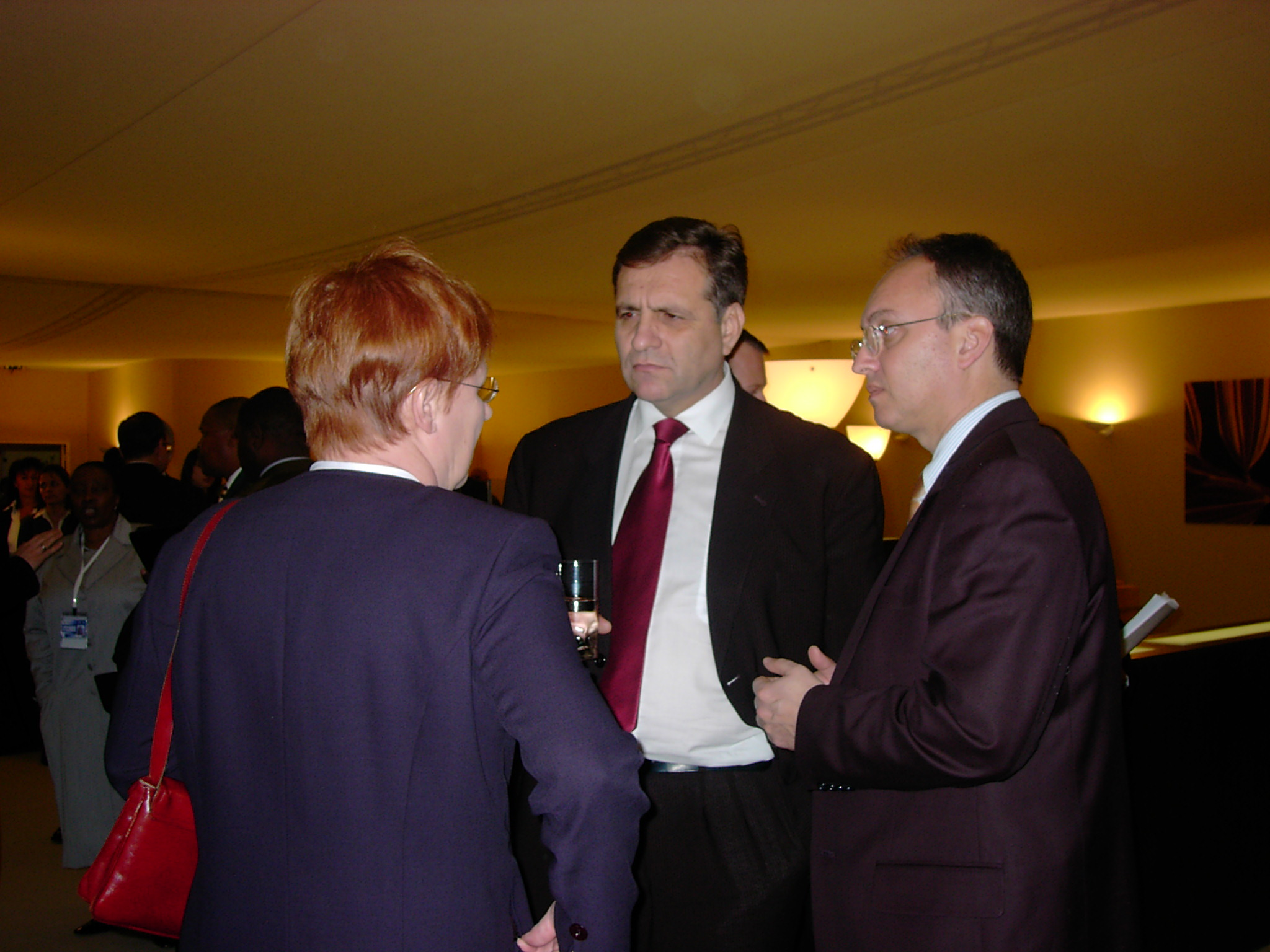
Macedonian president Boris Trajkovski, Finnish president Tarja Halonen, and then-secretary general of the president, Zoran Jolevski

After the Kosovo refugee crisis ended, Jolevski served as the adviser to Boris Trajkovski, who was a candidate for the Macedonian presidential elections in 1999. Jolevski prepared the presidential program, including writing speeches and serving in other capacities. Following the election, which Trajkovski won, Jolevski served as the secretary general, which replaced the former position of chief of staff. Jolevski was in this position from 1999 to 2004, and also served as the deputy negotiator and chief consultant to the minister of economy for accession to the WTO. In 2000, Jolevski was the chief negotiator in the successful negotiations on the reestablishment of diplomatic relations between Macedonia and the People's Republic of China. Jolevski was also a member of the Committee "E-Macedonia for All" under the auspices of Macedonia.

When the country faced insurgency in 2001, and while Zoran Jolevski was secretary general of the president, faced a number of political challenges. During this period, for example, there were several attempts to assassinate the president and his closest team, which was led by Jolevski. The Macedonian Government worked with the government of the United States and the EU on the Ohrid Framework Agreement, which brought peace in the Balkans; Zoran Jolevski was member of the negotiation team and he was the representative of President Trajkovski to the session of the Assembly of the Republic of North Macedonia for the constitutional changes required by the Ohrid Framework Agreement.

After peace was established, Jolevski became high involved in the International society especially at the United Nations Economic Commission for Europe, while remaining secretary general of the president. Jolevski was Member of Team of Specialists on Internet Enterprise Development, United Nations Economic Commission for Europe in Geneva, after that he became the Chairman of the Workshop: IPR and Trade Facilitation: "Identifying Opportunities and Roadblocks", "Second International Forum on Trade Facilitation : 14–15 May 2003 in Geneva, organized by the United Nations Economic Commission for Europe. Since 2005, Jolevski has served as the Vice Chairman of the Committee on Trade of the United Nations Economic Commission for Europe in Geneva.

From 2000 to 2001, Jolevski was member of the Management Board of "Skopje Fair", Skopje. During this time he was also member of the Management Board of "Alumina", Skopje.

Zoran Jolevski was supposed to be on board of the airplane that carried President Boris Trajkovski, which crashed near Mostar on 26 February 2004, and killed the president. Jolevski was asked by Boris Trajkovski the night prior to the flight to stay in Skopje and work on accession of North Macedonia into the NATO and the EU.

=== Consulting (2004–07) ===
After the death of President Trajkovski, Jolevski was nominated to be the Macedonian ambassador to the Permanent Mission of Macedonia to the WTO and the United Nations office at Geneva, Switzerland, but Jolevski rejected the nomination and is the only person in Macedonian history to reject an Ambassador position. Jolevski became a Professor at the European University-North Macedonia teaching International Economic Relations and Foreign Trade. In addition to teaching, he began a consulting career working as Chief of Party for a project by Booz Allen Hamilton that was funded by USAID called 'WTO Compliance Activity. He worked there until 2006. From 2006 to 2007, he was Chief of Party of another project by Booz Allen Hamilton funded by USAID called 'Macedonian Business Environment Activity.'

While working for Booz Allen Hamilton, Jolevski maintained his political involvement in the Macedonian government as an Economic and Foreign Policy Adviser to Nikola Gruevski, leader of the political party VMRO-DPMNE, who is the current Prime Minister of the Republic of Macedonia. In this role, Jolevski was responsible for advising Prime Minister Gruevski on economic and foreign policy issues, including preparation of the Election Program of the Party in the areas of foreign and economic policy. Zoran Jolevski was also a Special Adviser to Antonio Milososki, the current minister for foreign affairs. Jolevski was the consultant to the Government of the Republic for the preparation of the Answers to the Questionnaire for the preparation of the European Commission's Opinion on the application for membership to the European Union and Consultant to the Government and the United Nations Development Program (UNDP) for preparation of the Report for UN Millennium Development Goals for goal No 8 Partnership for Development.

Besides domestic consulting services, Jolevski was a consultant to the Serbian government for their accession to WTO in 2006. Later, he became the consultant to the Ethiopian government for the WTO accession. In August 2006, Jolevski was consultant to the president of Montenegro Filip Vujanovic on the same issue - the accession of Montenegro in WTO. In 2005, he was hired as a consultant to the Prime Minister of Lebanon for the WTO accession; however, because of the assassination of Rafic Hariri, Jolevski never worked for the government of Lebanon.

=== Private sector and NGOs (2004–07) ===
With his involvement in the Macedonian Government, and his international success, Jolevski became involved in several institutes and associations. In 2006, Jolevski formed the Institute for Economic Strategies and International Affairs – "Ohrid". After the death of Trajkovski, Jolevski served as the president of the International Foundation Boris Trajkovski until 2005.

Macedonian accession to NATO became a top issue of the Macedonian Government, which is why Jolevski was elected to be a member of the Presidency of Macedonian Euro-Atlantic Club in 2006; he is in this position today. He became involved in several other institutions, such as becoming a member of the Board of the Center for Strategic Research at the Macedonian Academy of Sciences and Arts and becoming member of Lions Centar, Skopje.

His managements skills brought him into the business sector. In 2006, Jolevski was elected President of the Management Board of Tobacco Company "Prilep" in Prilep, which was on the edge of bankruptcy. Jolevski with his team managed to bring it back and to put an end to the corruption that was going on in the Tobacco Company "Prilep".In 2005, he became a Member of the Management Board of Seavus Group and he still remains Member of the Management Board and President of the Management Board of Tobacco Company "Prilep". In 2006, Jolevski was member of the Management Board of Airports. His membership at Management the Board of Airports, controversial because of the accusations that Jolevski is the Godfather of the Greek name of "Alexander the Great Airport" in Skopje, and that triggered problems with Greece. Jolevski denied that he named the airport. Jolevski remained a member of Management Board of Airports until 2009 when a Turkish private company bought the airports.

=== Ambassador to the United States of America ===
Zoran Jolevski was appointed Macedonian Ambassador to the United States in March 2007 after Ljupčo Jordanovski was recalled by the Macedonian Government. He presented his accreditation to President George W. Bush on 25 July 2007 with his family. Jolevski was focused on strengthening the North Macedonia – United States relations and accession of Macedonia in NATO. In 2008, Jolevski signed an agreement on Strategic Partnership and Cooperation with United States Secretary of State Condoleezza Rice. His other focuses were bringing American companies to invest in Macedonia and working with the Diaspora. The United States remains a s supporter of country's accession in NATO and EU. His offices are based at the Moses House in Washington, D.C.. During his tenure, Jolevski guest-lectured at many universities including the University of Georgia, University of Vermont, American University, Ohio State University, Utah Valley University, George Washington University, Ohio University, Norwich University, among others. In June 2014, following the 2014 Macedonian parliamentary election, Ambassador Jolevski was appointed Minister of Defence in the new government of Prime Minister Nikola Gruevski, ending his term as Macedonian ambassador to the United States.

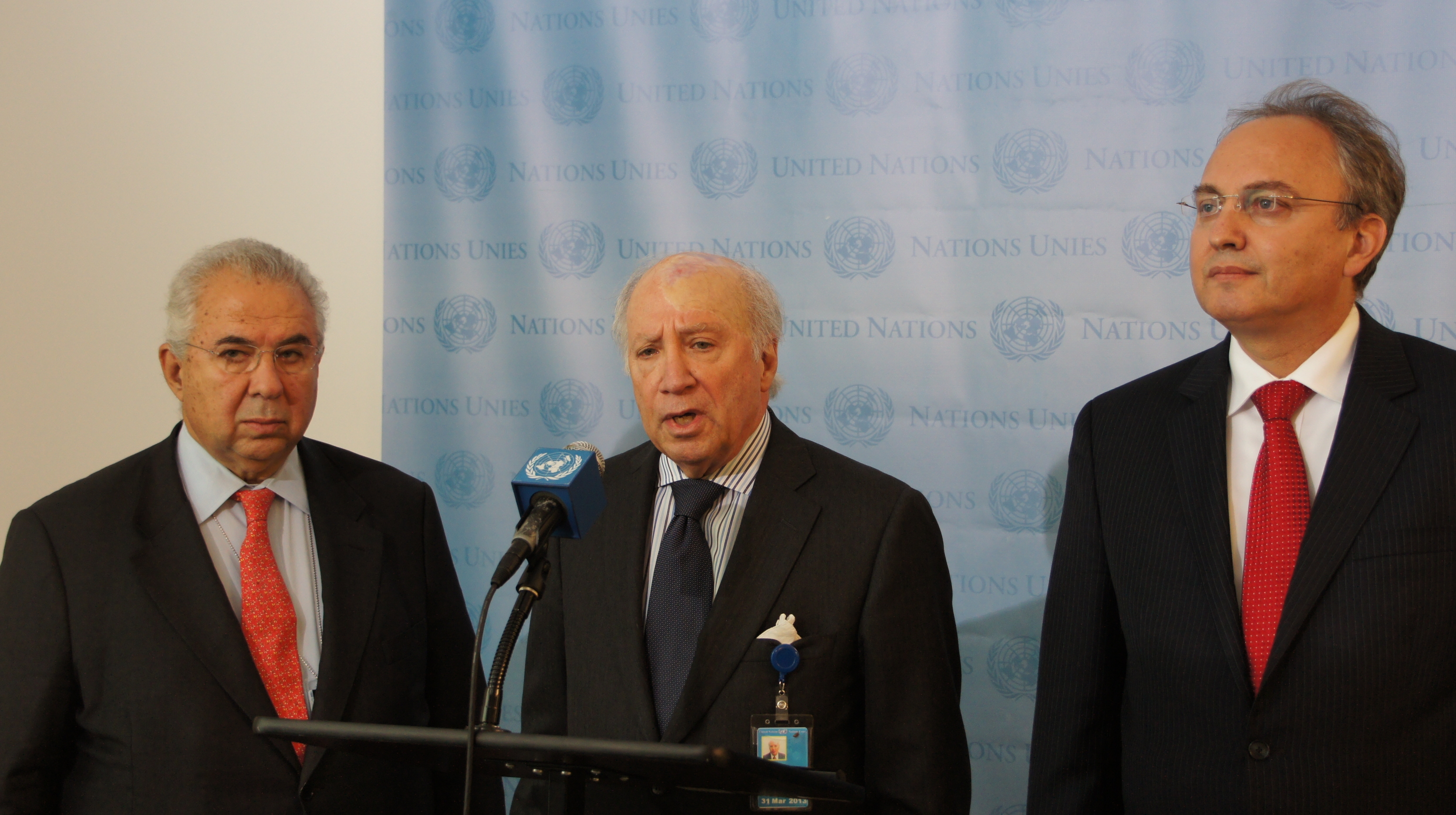
Ambassador Zoran Jolevski with Greek Negotiator Ambassador Adamantios Vassilakis and UN Mediator Ambassador Matthew Nimetz at a Press Conference after the round of negotiations

=== Macedonia's naming dispute (2007–2014) ===
After Branko Crvenkovski decided to withdraw from the negotiations by recalling Nikola Dimitrov, the prime minister Nikola Gruevski asked Ambassador Jolevski to take over the negotiations of the Macedonia naming dispute with Greece that had been in progress for 17 years. Jolevski became the Chief negotiator in November 2008.

During the name talks in Geneva on 22 June 2009, Ambassador Jolevski stated the position of the Macedonian side of the negotiations which is that:

"We are ready for a compromise name that would not undermine our national identity and dignity"

=== Ambassador to Mexico and Organization of American States ===
On 21 January 2011, Jolevski presented his credentials to President Felipe Calderón, becoming the first Macedonian ambassador to Mexico, acting from his office in Washington, D.C.

On 18 May 2011, the Rcountry was accepted as Permanent Observer in the Organization of American States, making Jolevski the first Permanent Observer at the Organization of American States.

=== Minister of Defence (2014–2017) ===
On 7 June 2014, the Macedonian press announced that Ambassador Jolevski joined the government of Nikola Gruevski as the new minister of defence. The new government was confirmed in front of the parliament on 19 June. Jolevski was the wealthiest Minister in the newest government.

Among his top priorities remain the integration into NATO, as well as military modernization. Jolevski has also focused on increasing the country's cybersecurity capabilities, reforming the Military Academy, and creating joint partnerships with armed forces of NATO member countries. Given his previous position as Ambassador to the United States, he is perceived as a close friend of the United States of America.

During his term, Minister Jolevski initiated the participation of Macedonian Armed Forces in the Resolute Support Mission that followed the successful completion of the ISAF mission.

== Speaker at international conferences, forums and symposiums ==
Zoran Jolevski has participated in more than 100 international summits, forums and conferences, including the World Economic Forum in Davos in 2000, 2001 and 2003, as well as the World Economic Forum in New York in 2002. Also he participated in the second and the fourth WTO Ministerial Conference, the World Summit on Sustainable Development 2002 in Johannesburg, and World Food Summit 2002 in Rome. Jolevski represented North Macedonia in the conference for the United Nations Convention against Transnational Organized Crime in 2000 in Palermo, Italy. During his work in the United States, Jolevski organized multiple conferences for the business environment.

== Research and publications ==
-Ph.D. thesis at the Faculty of Economy on The WTO Agreements and Foreign Trade Regime of the Macedonia, over 300 pages.
-Master of Science thesis at the Faculty of Law in Skopje, The Business Policy of the Multinational Corporations, 125 pages.
-Succession of states: the case of ex-Yugoslavia, Institute of Social Studies, The Hague, The Netherlands, June 1993
-The World Trading System, 305 pages published by Matica, Skopje, Macedonia 2006
-Multinational Corporations: Challenge of the Contemporary Economy, 226 pages, published by Ecopress, Skopje, 1997
-Foreign Trade of Macedonia 2005, published by the Ministry of Economy, USAID and WTO Compliance Activity, Skopje 2005
-Foreign Trade of Macedonia2006, published by the Ministry of Economy, USAID and Ohird Institute, Skopje 2006
-Mandate for Leadership: Principles for Governing Macedonia 2006–2010, published by the Institute for Economic Strategies and International Affairs – "Ohrid", Skopje 2006

Jolevski also published several articles on economy in newspapers such as Vecer and Utrinski.

== See also ==
- Foreign relations of North Macedonia
- North Macedonia–United States relations
- Boris Trajkovski
- Boris Trajanov

Political offices
| Preceded by Talat Xhaferi | Minister of Defence; 2014-2017 | Succeeded by Radmila Šekerinska |
