= North Macedonia–United States relations =

- North Macedonia: United States

Diplomatic mission
- Embassy of North Macedonia, Washington, D.C.: Embassy of the United States, Skopje

Envoy
- Ambassador Zoran Popov: Ambassador Angela Aggeler

The United States and North Macedonia enjoy excellent bilateral relations.

== History ==
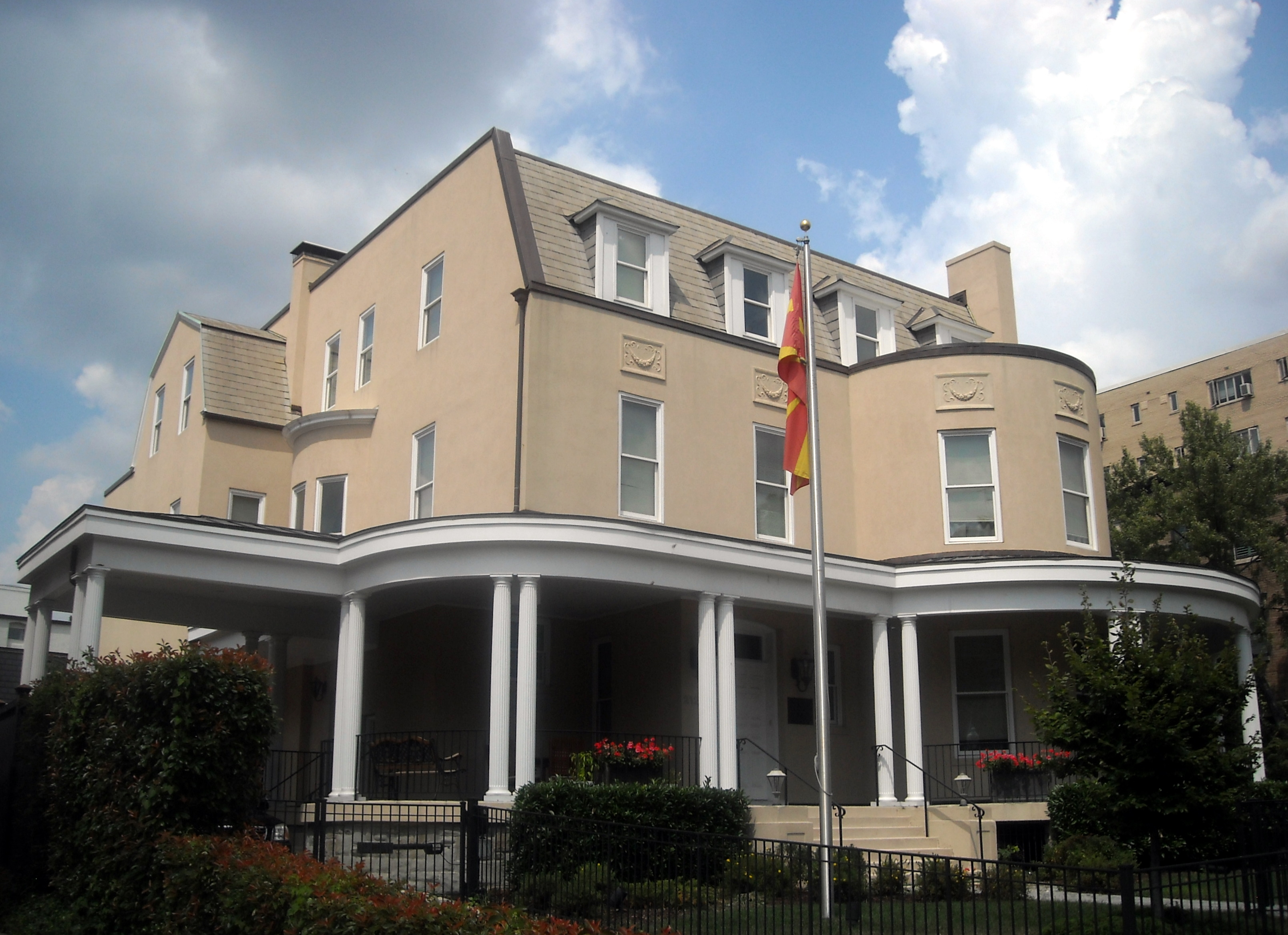
The Embassy of North Macedonia to the U.S. in Washington, D.C.

The United States formally recognized North Macedonia in 1994, and the two countries established full diplomatic relations in 1995. The U.S. Liaison Office was upgraded to an Embassy in February 1996, and the first U.S. Ambassador to Skopje arrived in July 1996. The development of political relations between the United States and North Macedonia has ushered in a whole host of other contacts between the two states.

The United States, together with its European allies, strongly condemned the initiators of the 2001 insurgency in North Macedonia and closely supported the government and major parties' successful efforts to forge a peaceful, political solution to the crisis through the Ohrid Framework Agreement. In partnership with the EU and other international organizations active in North Macedonia, the United States is facilitating the Government's implementation of the Framework Agreement and fostering long-term peace and stability in the country. North Macedonia continues to make an important contribution to regional stability by facilitating the logistical supply of NATO (including U.S.) peacekeepers in Kosovo.

Today, North Macedonia and the United States enjoy a cooperative relationship across a broad range of political, economic, cultural, military, and social issues. The United States supports North Macedonia's aspirations to build a democratically secure and market-oriented society, and has donated large amounts of foreign assistance for democracy and economic reforms, defense reforms, and projects to strengthen rule of law and improve education. Bilateral assistance budgeted to North Macedonia under the Support Europe Economic Development (SEED) Act totaled over $320 million from 1990 to 2004, including budget support and other assistance to help North Macedonia recover from the 2001 crisis. North Macedonia received approximately $37 million in SEED Act assistance in 2005.

In April 2025, President Donald Trump implemented a tariff program on all foreign nations which included a tariff of 33% on North Macedonia imports. On 3 June 2025, North Macedonia announced its plan to abolish all import taxes on the U.S. in hopes of reaching a reciprocal 0% tariff agreement with the Trump Administration.

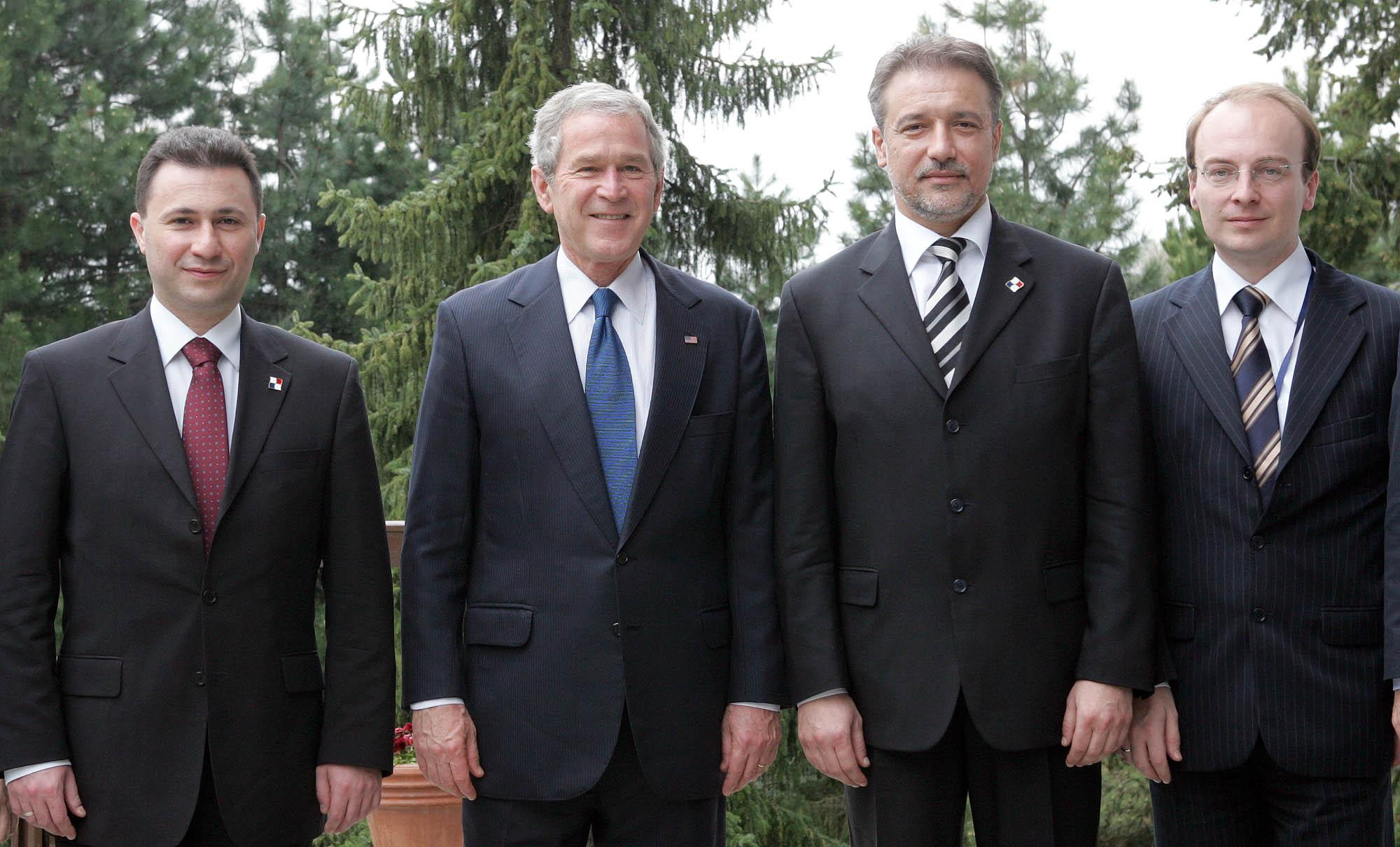
George W. Bush with the leaders of North Macedonia in 2008

U.S. Agency for International Development (USAID) programs in North Macedonia promote accelerated growth, support stronger democratic institutions, and help educate citizens of North Macedonia for a modern economy. A key focus of U.S. assistance is helping North Macedonia implement the August 2001 Framework Agreement; implementing the decentralization provision is a priority. USAID is targeting capacity building for local government officials, who will have more authority and responsibility devolved from the central government, as well as providing grants to fund small-scale infrastructure projects.

A further priority of U.S. assistance is to facilitate North Macedonia's transition to a market economy and increase employment and growth levels. USAID has identified and is now assisting the five most competitive sub-sectors of North Macedonia's economy. USAID also helps local enterprises through business resource centers, improved access to credit and equity, trade and investment facilitation, and training. Programs target improvements in the business-enabling environment by helping to bring legislative and regulatory frameworks in line with EU standards and improving the transparency and efficiency of government services through technology. A resident U.S. Department of Treasury advisor is assisting the Ministry of Finance improve strategy, planning and execution, and public expenditure management.

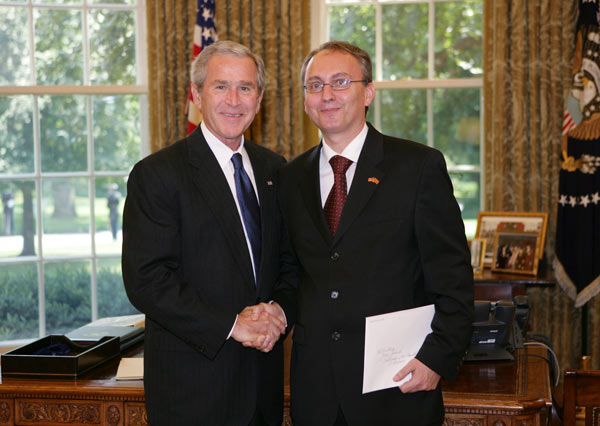
Ambassador Zoran Jolevski with George W. Bush at the accreditation ceremony

USAID is working to strengthen North Macedonia's non-governmental organization (NGO) and community networks, encourage judicial reform, in particular by modernizing court administration, and build capacity and transparency of the parliament and local governments. USAID has helped strengthen the State Election Commission's capacity to administer elections and supported domestic NGO election monitoring of the spring 2005 municipal elections. A U.S. Department of Justice Resident Legal Advisor focuses on strengthening the independence of the judiciary, efficacy of public prosecution, reform of criminal codes, and capacity to fight trafficking in persons and organized crime.

Complementing its assistance in North Macedonia's political and economic transition, USAID programs improve education and human capacity in North Macedonia through projects on the primary, secondary, and post-secondary levels. Targets include improving teaching techniques, modernizing vocational education, providing computer labs in all schools, and expanding broadband Internet service throughout the country using primary and secondary schools as a platform. Other programs address crosscutting issues, including interethnic cooperation, assistance to the Romani minority, corruption, HIV/AIDS, and trafficking.

Vasko Naumovski is the current Ambassador of North Macedonia in the United States. In 2008, the government of North Macedonia signed an executive agreement on Strategic Partnership and Mutual Cooperation. The agreement was signed by United States Secretary of State Condoleezza Rice and the Minister of Foreign Affairs of North Macedonia Antonio Milošoski.

The US and North Macedonia are also two of the countries in the world that do not recognize the State Of Palestine, and have good relations with Israel.

== Public opinion ==
According to the 2012 U.S. Global Leadership Report, 44% of Macedonians approve of U.S. leadership, with 23% disapproving and 33% uncertain. In two surveys from 2021, Macedonians for the first time view the US as more influential in the country than the EU, a stance that Albanians of North Macedonia already hold.

== Embassy ==
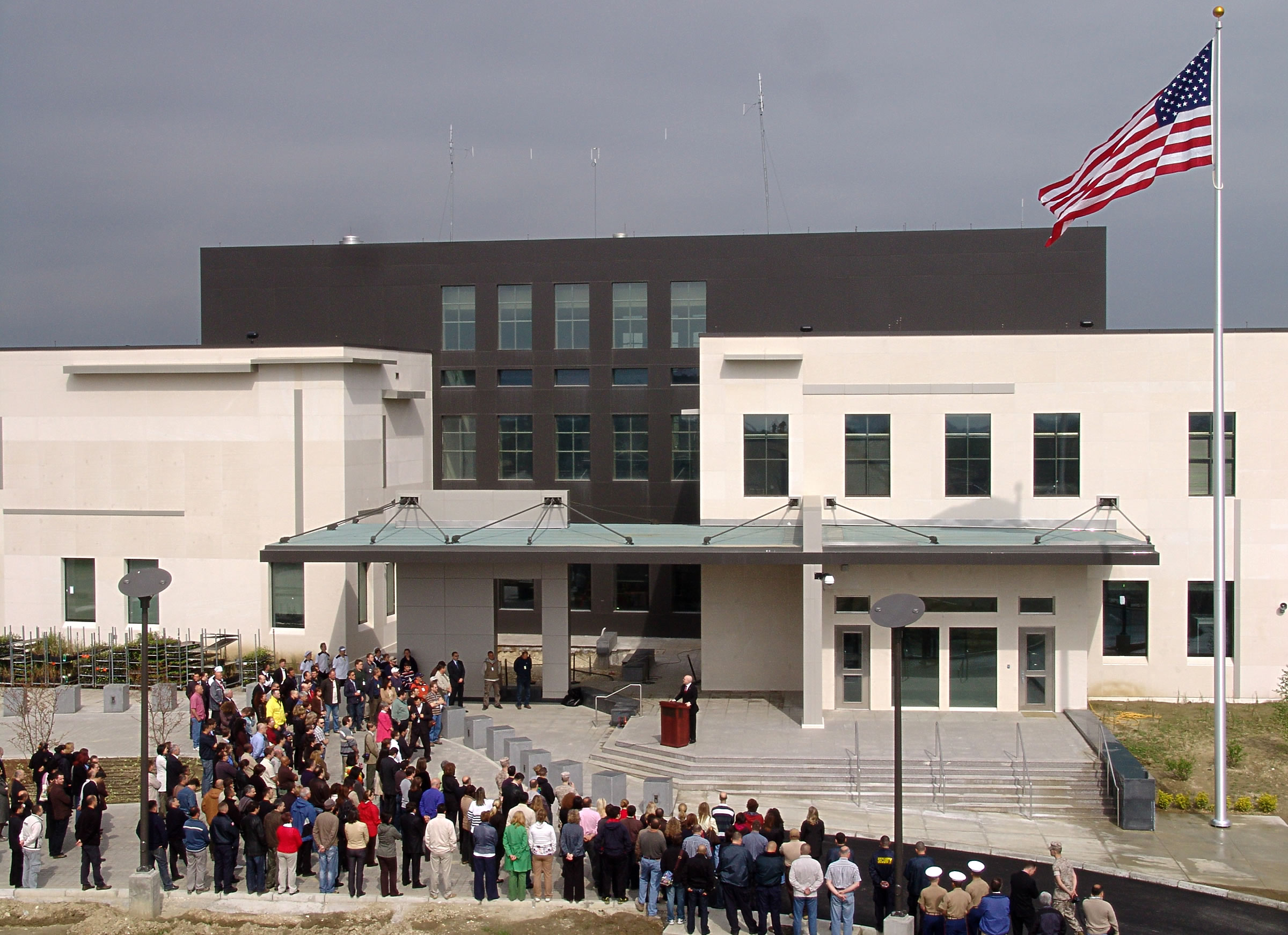
Embassy of the United States in Skopje

Principal U.S. Officials include:

- Ambassador—Angela Aggeler

The Embassy of the United States in North Macedonia is located in Skopje.

== See also ==
- List of ambassadors of North Macedonia to the United States
- List of ambassadors of the United States to North Macedonia
- Macedonian Americans
- United States–Yugoslavia relations
