= European University Skopje =

Private university in Skopje, North Macedonia

European University
- Европски универзитет Evropski univerzitet
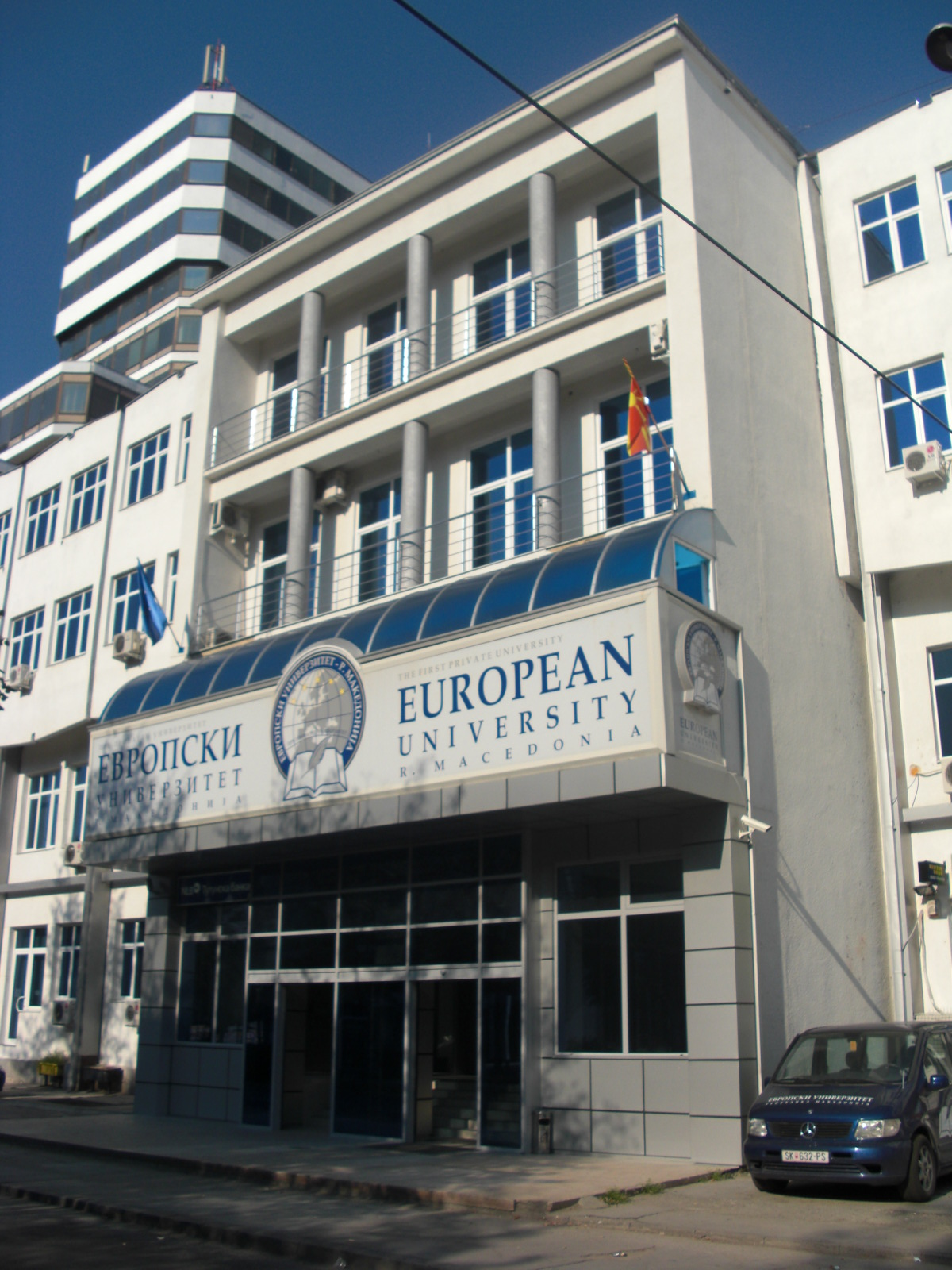
- European University building in Skopje
- Type: Private
- Established: 1 June 2005; 21 years ago
- Students: 504 (2018–19)
- Location: Skopje, North Macedonia; 41°59′39″N 21°25′27″E
- Website: www.eu.edu.mk

University rankings

Regional – Overall
- QS Emerging Europe and Central Asia: 351-400 (2022)

The European University Skopje (Macedonian: Европски универзитет Скопје, romanized: Evropski univerzitet Skopje) is a private university headquartered in Skopje, North Macedonia.

== History ==
The European University begins with the foundation of The Faculty of Social Sciences in 2001. The activities at the university were recognized in June 2005 when it was accredited by The Accreditation Board of Republic of Macedonia.

November 2006 saw the founding and accreditation of three faculties:

- Faculty of Communication and Media,
- Faculty of Public Administration,
- Faculty of Art and Design.

Until then there were two faculties - The Faculty of Economic Sciences and The Faculty of Informatics.

In May 2006, based on the decision number 12 of The Accreditation of Republic of North Macedonia, the adequacy of the programs of The European University according to the European standards of the 3+2 module of studying was confirmed.

== Address ==
- European University - Republic of North Macedonia
- Kliment Ohridski Blvd 68
- Skopje 1000, North Macedonia

== Faculties ==
The university has seven faculties:

- Faculty of Economics
- Faculty of Informatics
- Faculty of Law
- Faculty of Art and Design
- Faculty of Detectives and Criminology
- Faculty of Dentistry

== Accreditation ==
The official list of accredited universities and schools in the Republic of North Macedonia is maintained by the Ministry of Education and Science and can be found at http://www.mon.gov.mk/index.php/dokumenti/akreditacii

The university is the sole higher education institution of the Balkans whose undergraduate and postgraduate study programs of the Faculty of Economy has been accredited by the International Assembly for Collegiate Business Education (IACBE). IACBE is a body for the accreditation of business and study programs, connected to business of undergraduate and postgraduate studies in colleges and universities. IACBE has over 200 member universities. Their accreditation means that the degrees obtained from the EURM are acknowledged by colleges in the USA and the other members of IACBE.

== Notable faculty ==
- Zoran Jolevski, former Macedonian Ambassador to the United States
