= List of diplomatic missions of North Macedonia =

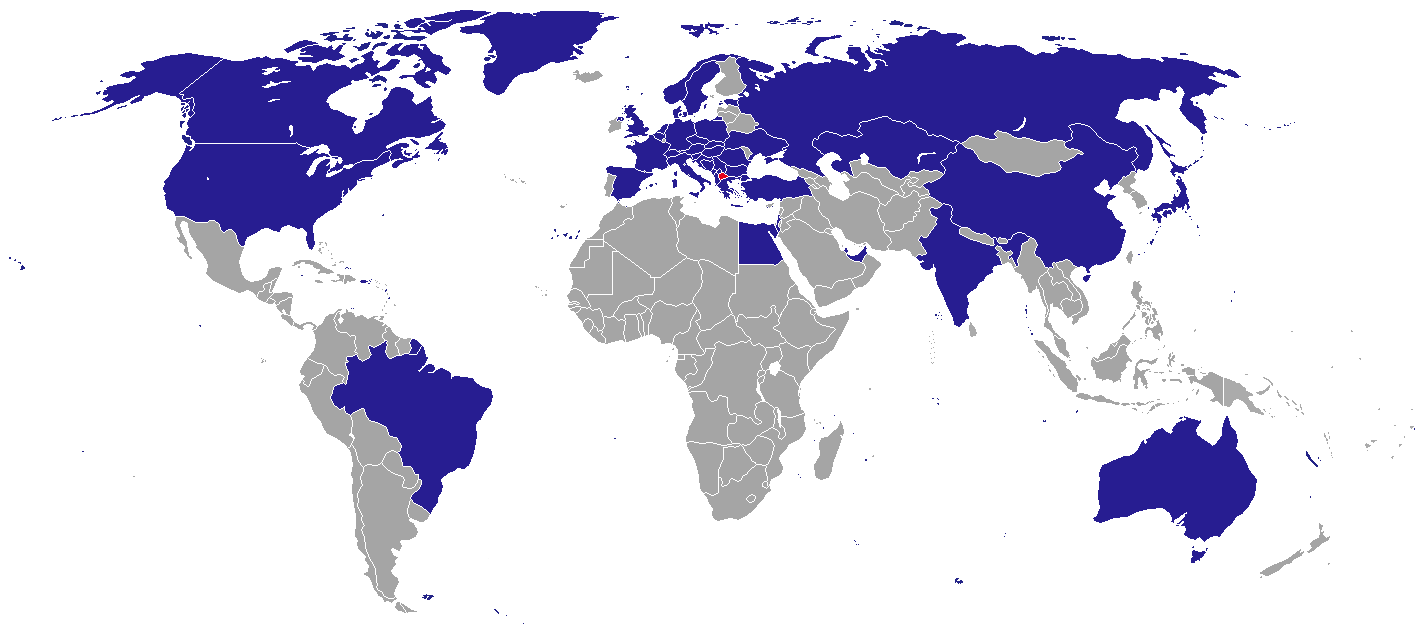
Map of North Macedonia's diplomatic missions

This is a list of diplomatic missions of North Macedonia, excluding honorary consulates.

== Africa ==
- Egypt
  - Cairo (Embassy)

== Americas ==
- Brazil
  - Brasília (Embassy)
- Canada
  - Ottawa (Embassy)
  - Toronto (Consulate General)
- United States
  - Washington, D.C. (Embassy)
  - Chicago (Consulate-General)
  - Detroit (Consulate General)
  - Ridgefield Park (Consulate General)

== Asia ==
- China
  - Beijing (Embassy)
- India
  - New Delhi (Embassy)
- Israel
  - Tel Aviv (Embassy)
- Japan
  - Tokyo (Embassy)
- Kazakhstan
  - Astana (Embassy)
- Qatar
  - Doha (Embassy)
- Turkey
  - Ankara (Embassy)
  - Istanbul (Consulate General)
- United Arab Emirates
  - Abu Dhabi (Embassy)

== Europe ==
- Albania
  - Tirana (Embassy)
- Austria
  - Vienna (Embassy)
- Belgium
  - Brussels (Embassy)
- Bosnia and Herzegovina
  - Sarajevo (Embassy)
- Bulgaria
  - Sofia (Embassy)
- Croatia
  - Zagreb (Embassy)
- Czechia
  - Prague (Embassy)
- Denmark
  - Copenhagen (Embassy)
- Estonia
  - Tallinn (Embassy)
- France
  - Paris (Embassy)
- Germany
  - Berlin (Embassy)
  - Bonn (Embassy office)
  - Munich (Consulate-General)
- Greece
  - Athens (Embassy)
  - Thessaloniki (Consulate General)
- Holy See
  - Rome (Embassy) (Note: The Embassy of North Macedonia to the Holy See is located outside Vatican territory in Rome.)
- Hungary
  - Budapest (Embassy)
- Italy
  - Rome (Embassy)
  - Venice (Consulate General)
- Kosovo
  - Pristina (Embassy)
- Lithuania
  - Vilnius (Embassy)
- Montenegro
  - Podgorica (Embassy)
- Netherlands
  - The Hague (Embassy)
- Norway
  - Oslo (Embassy)
- Poland
  - Warsaw (Embassy)
- Romania
  - Bucharest (Embassy)
- Russia
  - Moscow (Embassy)
- Serbia
  - Belgrade (Embassy)
- Slovenia
  - Ljubljana (Embassy)
- Slovakia
  - Bratislava (Embassy)
- Spain
  - Madrid (Embassy)
- Sweden
  - Stockholm (Embassy)
- Switzerland
  - Bern (Embassy)
- Ukraine
  - Kyiv (Embassy)
- United Kingdom
  - London (Embassy)

== Oceania ==
- Australia
  - Canberra (Embassy)
  - Melbourne (Consulate General)

== Multilateral organizations ==
- Brussels (Permanent Mission to the European Union and NATO)
- Geneva (Permanent Mission to the United Nations and international organizations)
- New York City (Permanent Mission to the United Nations)
- Paris (Permanent Mission to UNESCO)
- Rome (Permanent Mission to Food and Agriculture Organization)
- Strasbourg (Permanent Mission to the Council of Europe)
- Vienna (Permanent Mission to Organization for Security and Co-operation in Europe)

== Gallery ==
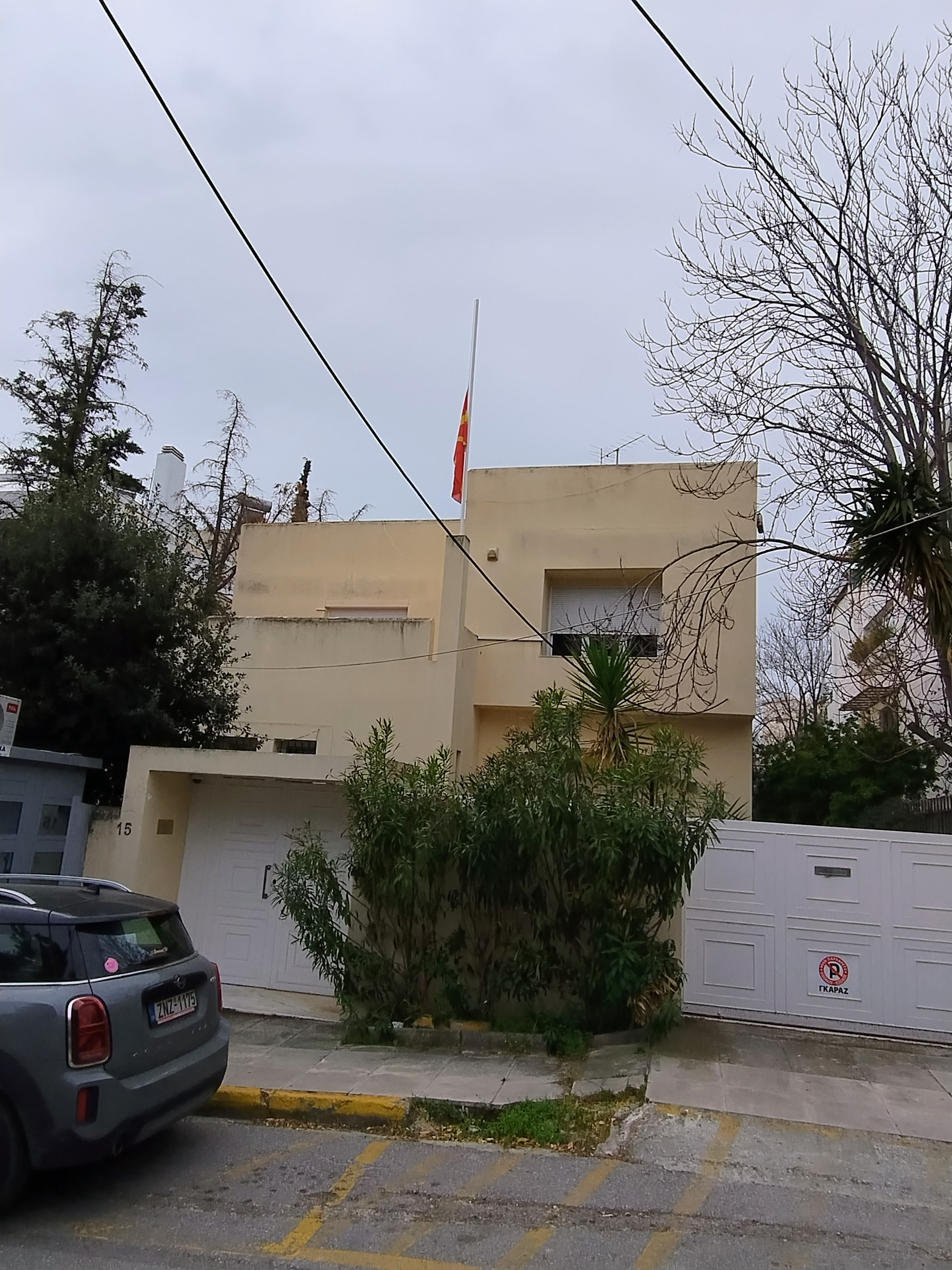
Embassy in Athens

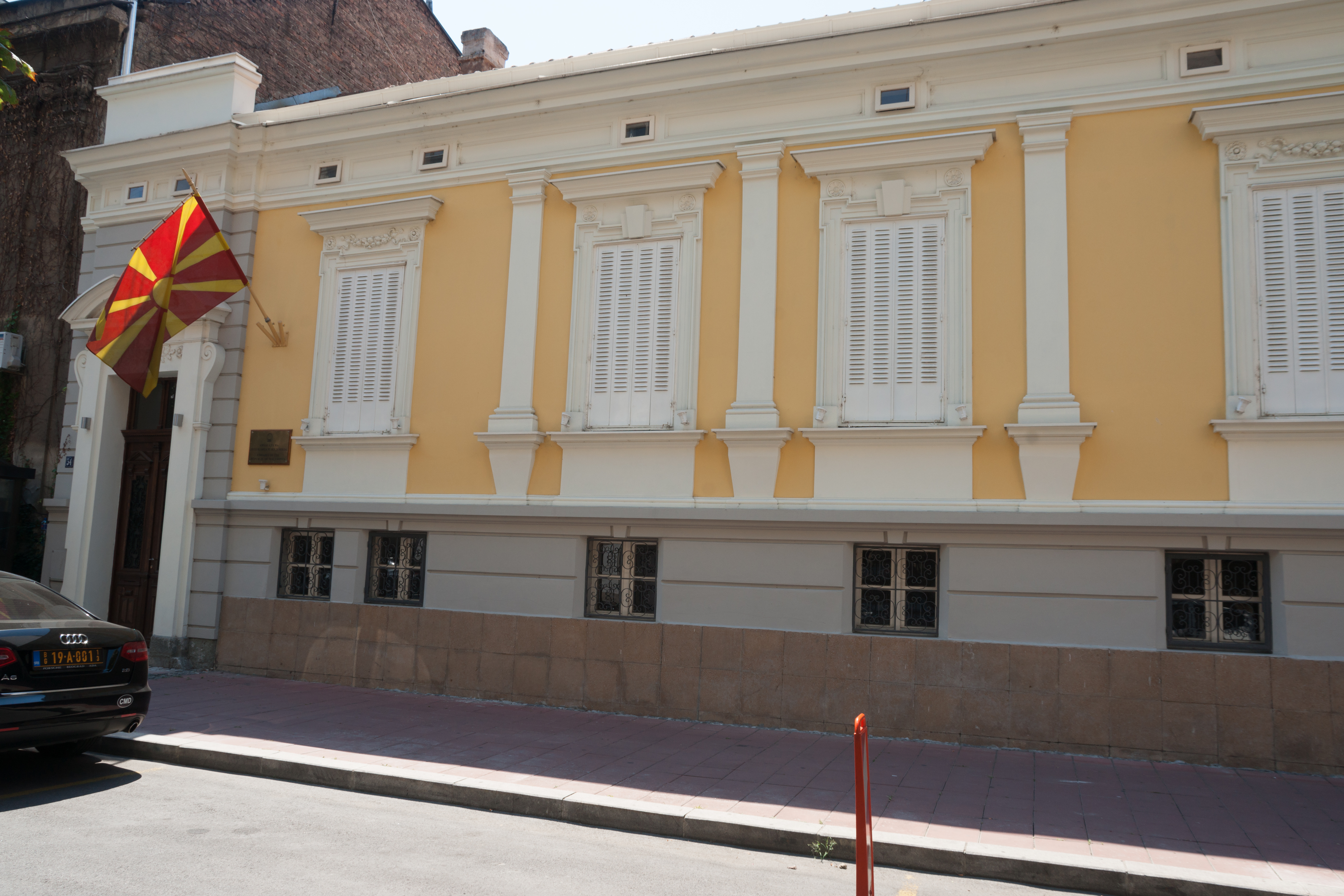
Embassy in Belgrade

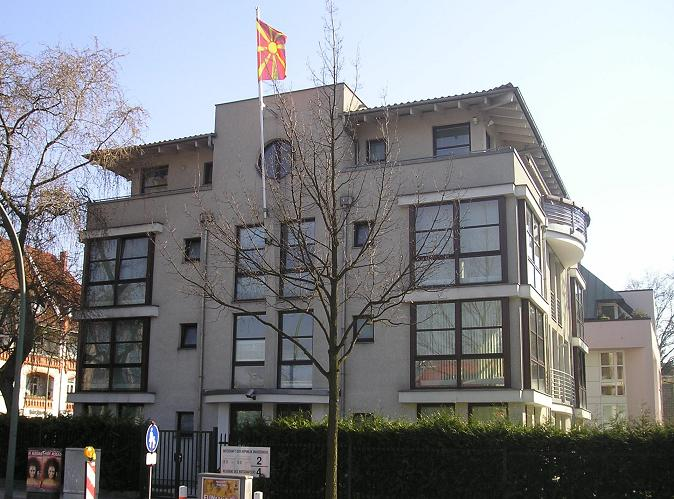
Embassy in Berlin

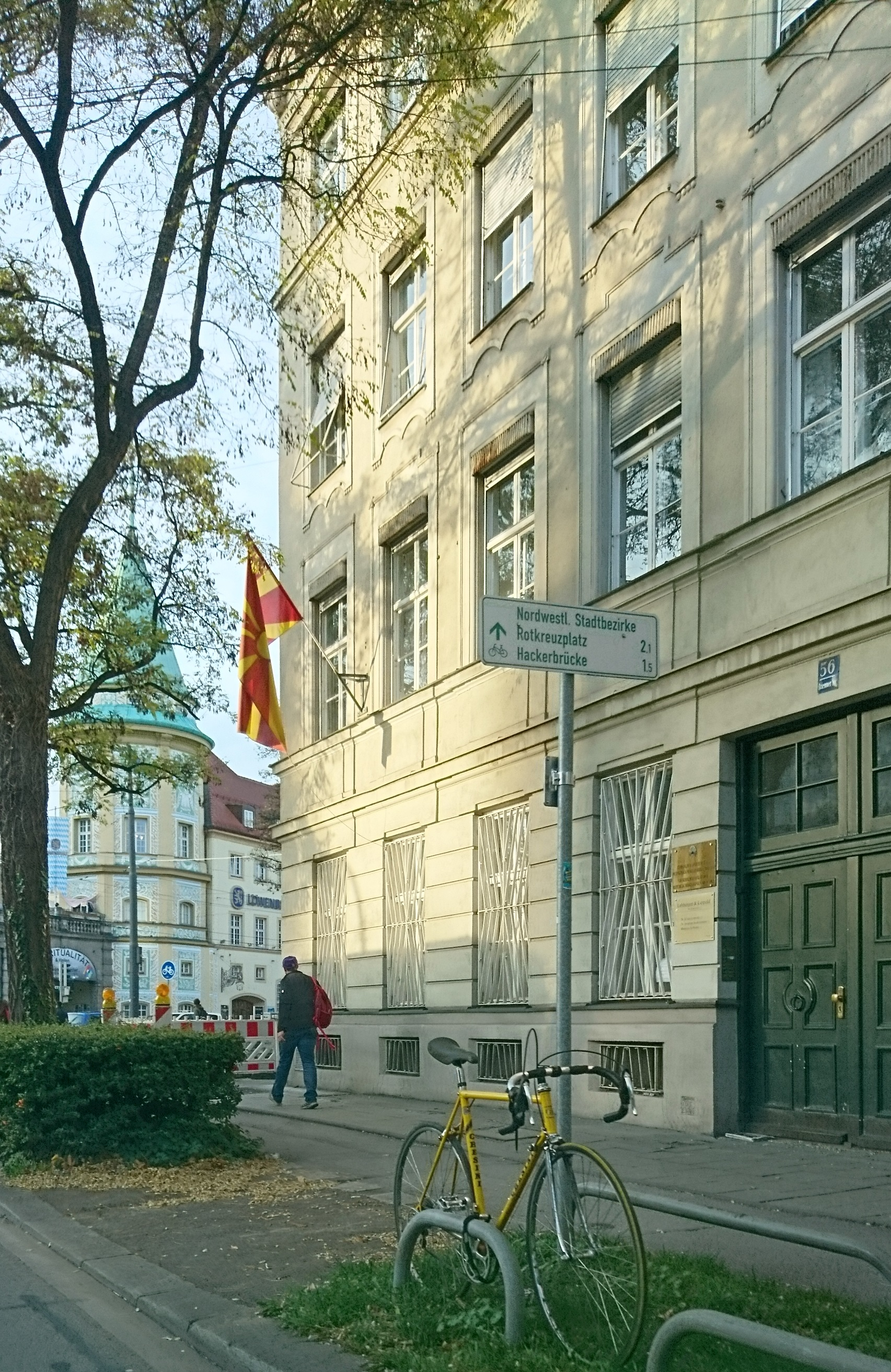
Consulate-General in Munich

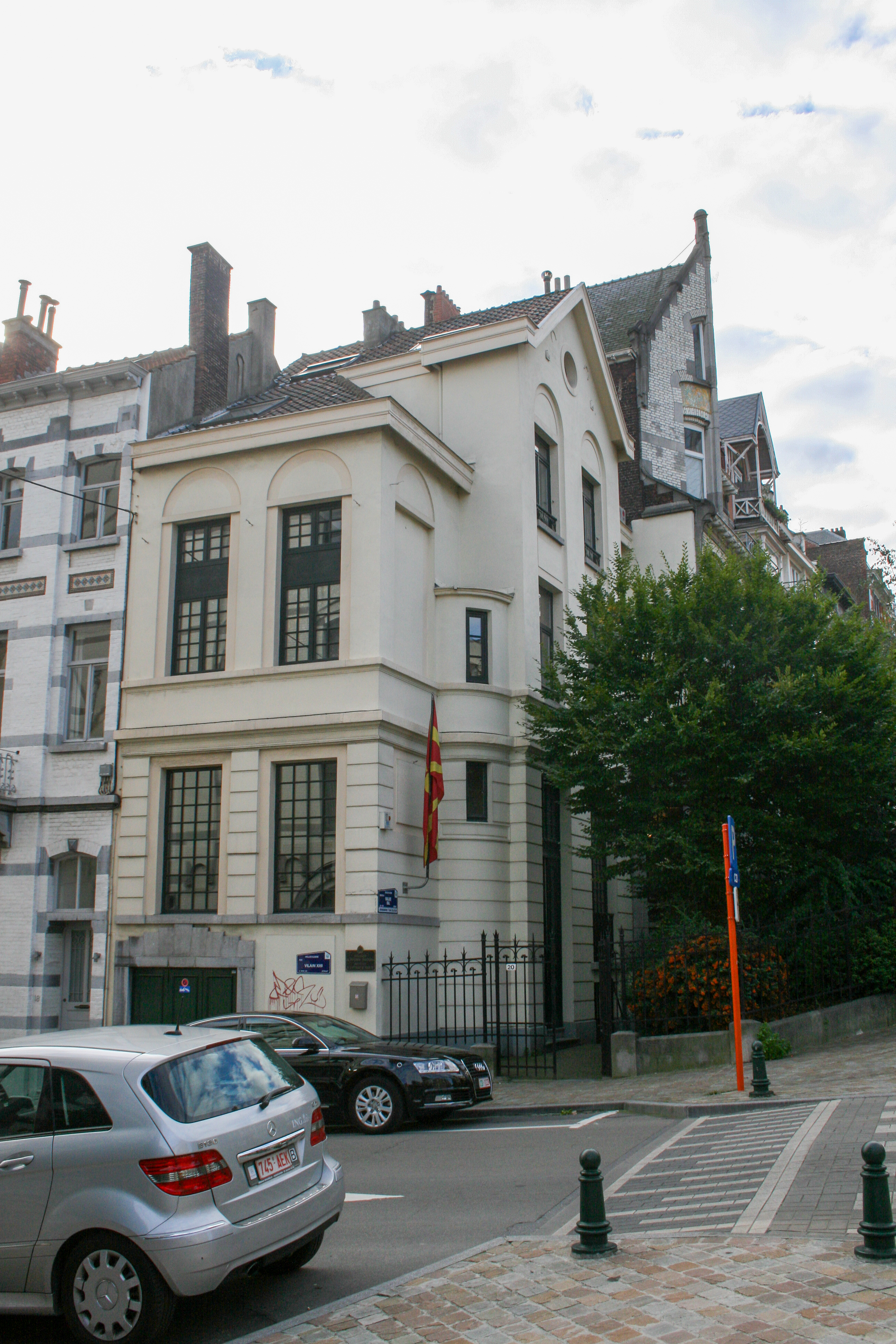
Embassy in Brussels

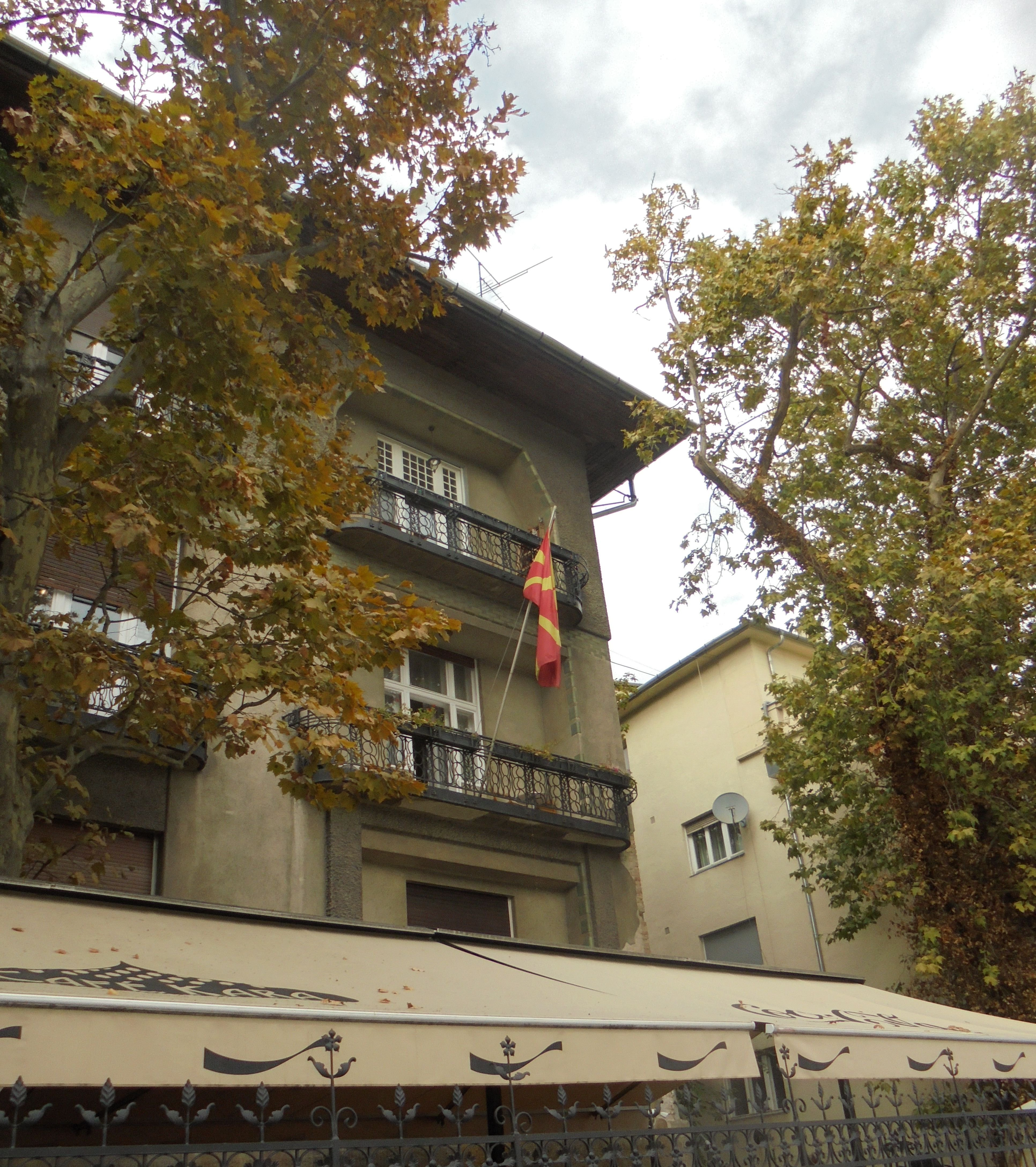
Embassy in Budapest

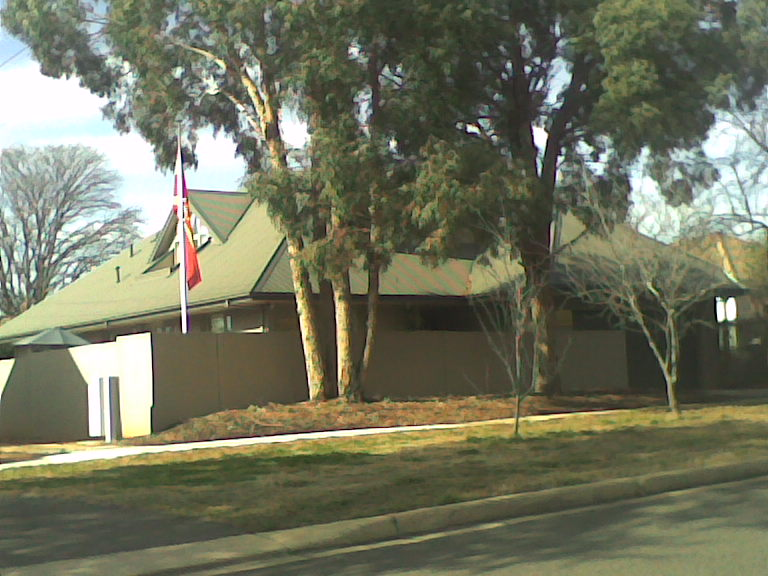
Embassy in Canberra

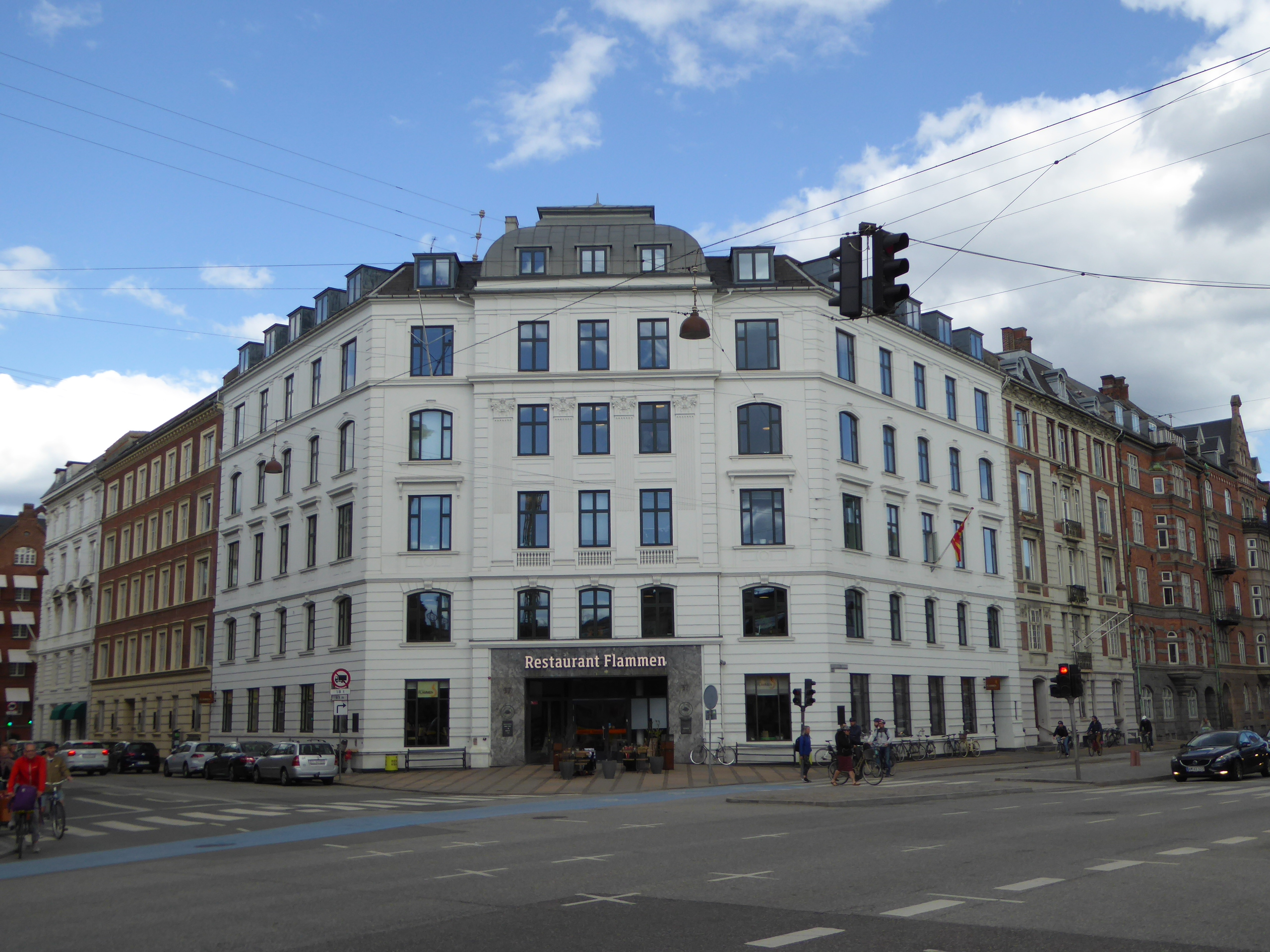
Embassy in Copenhagen

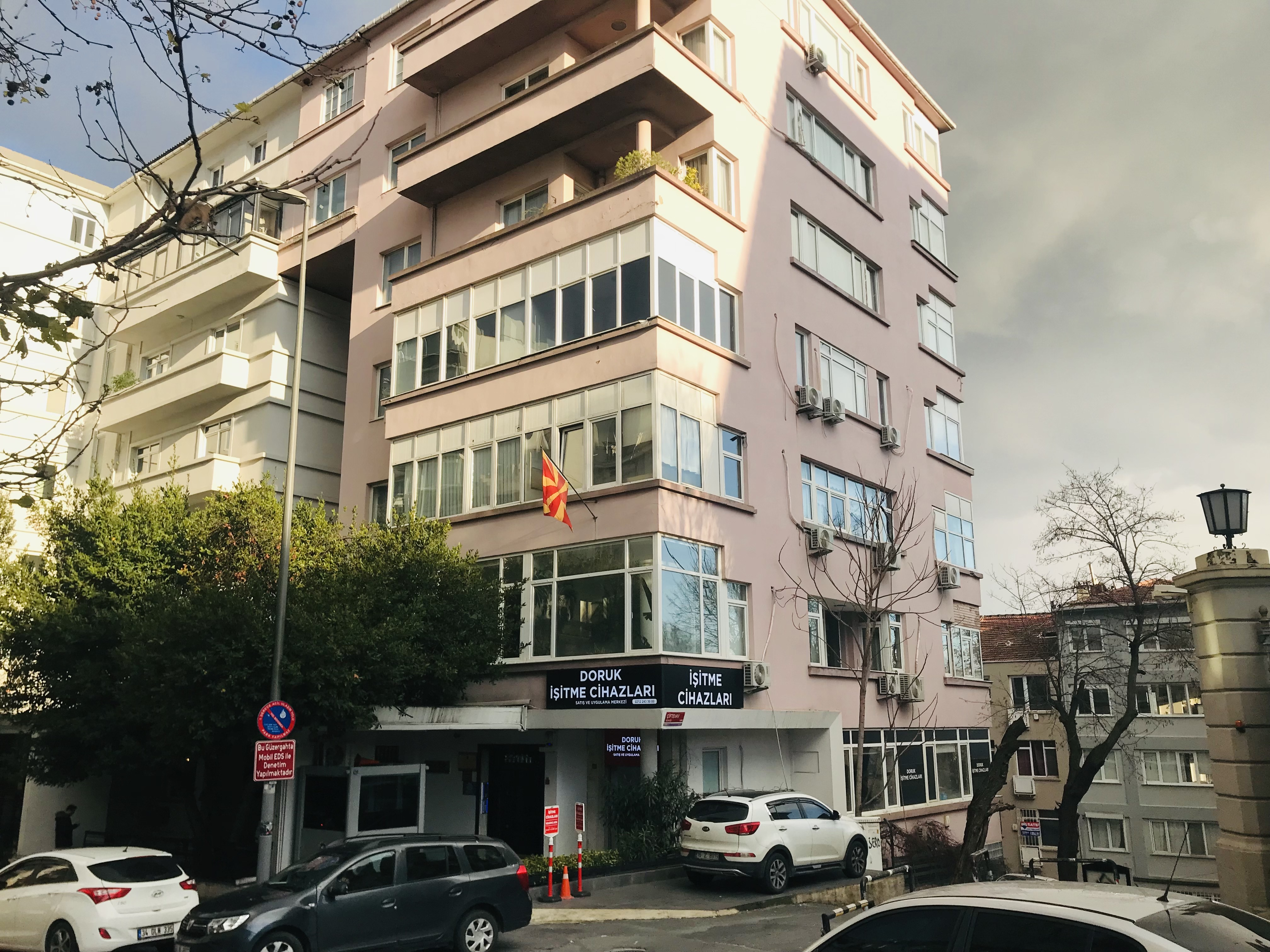
Consulate-General in Istanbul

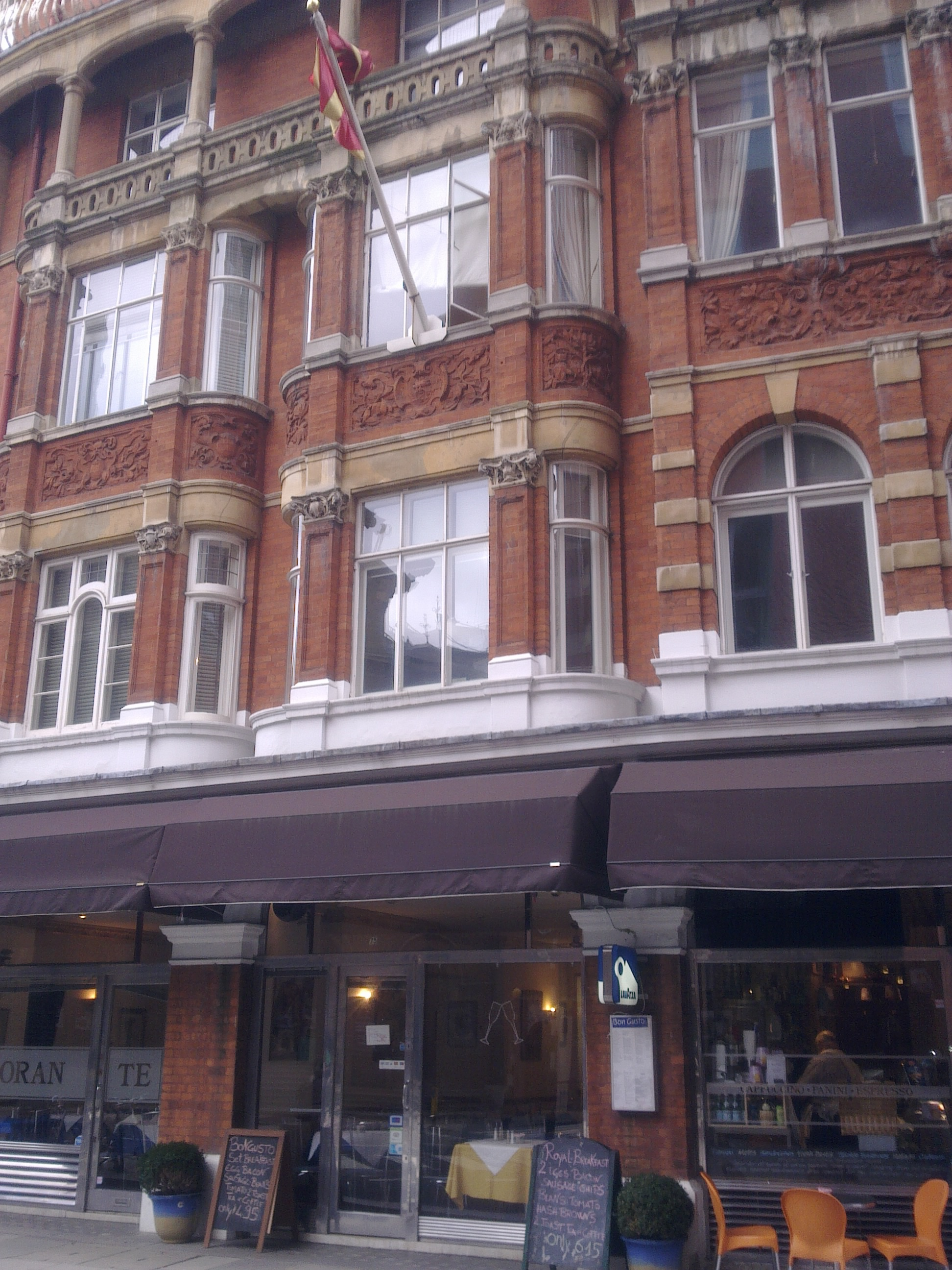
Embassy in London

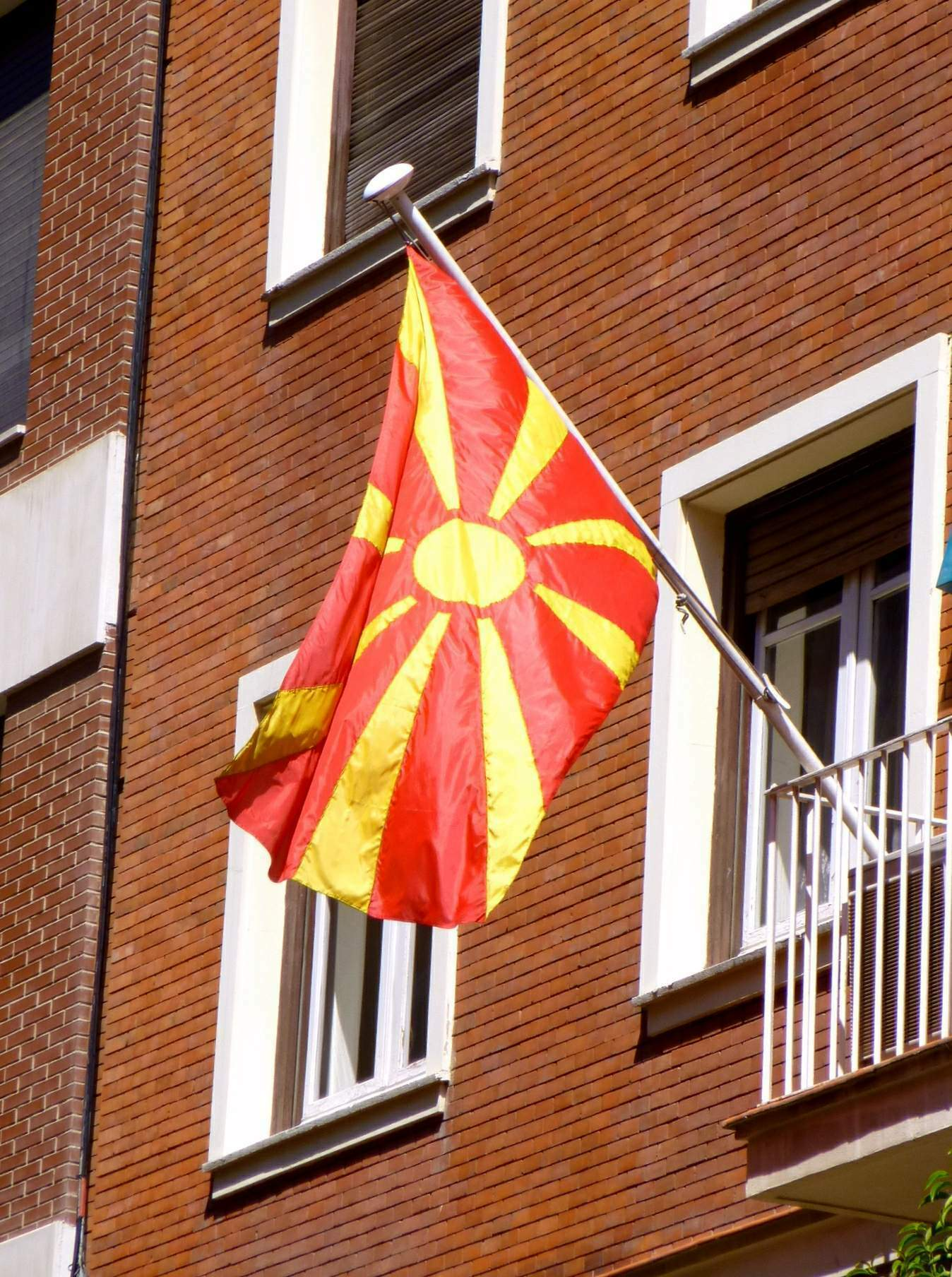
Embassy in Madrid

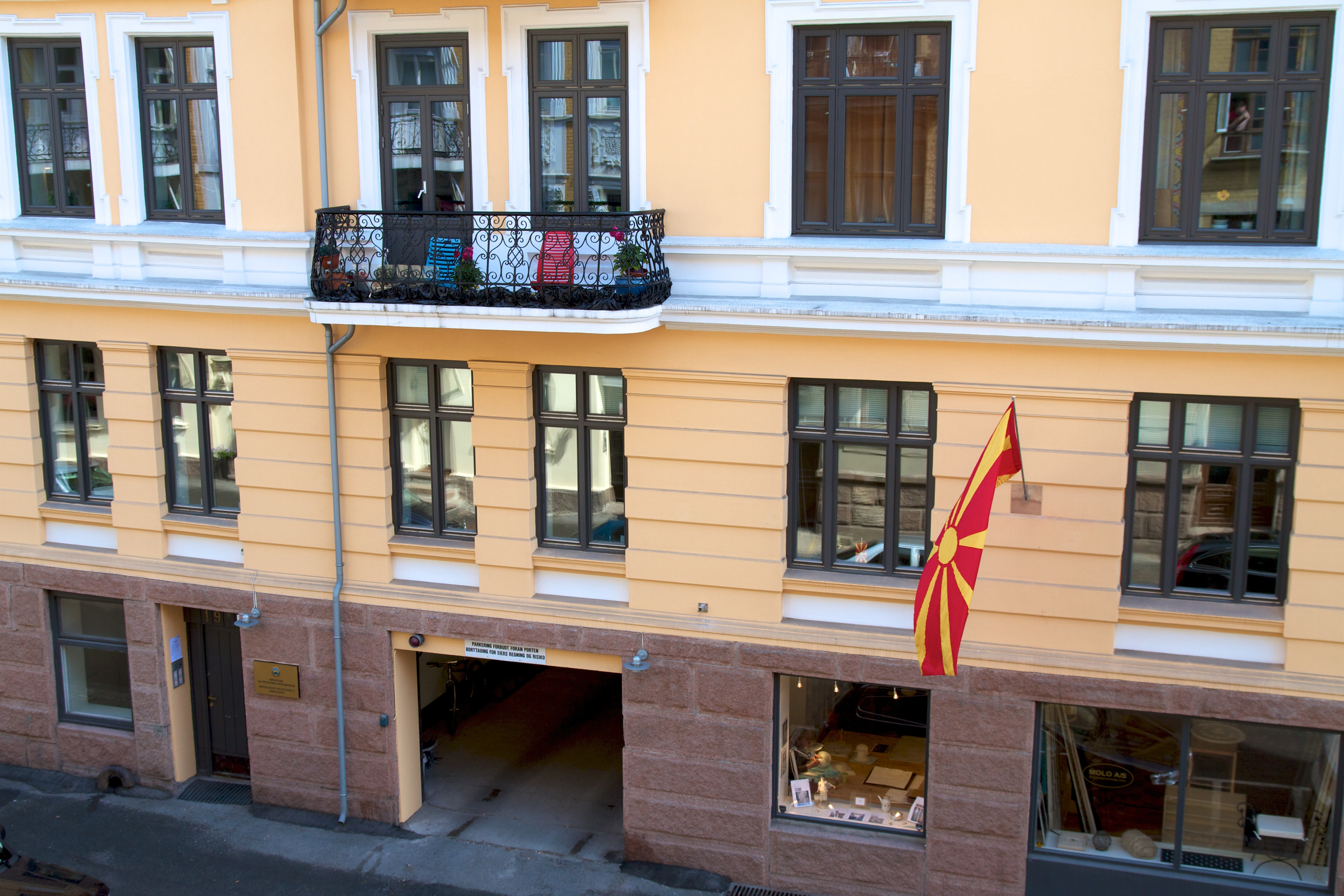
Embassy in Oslo

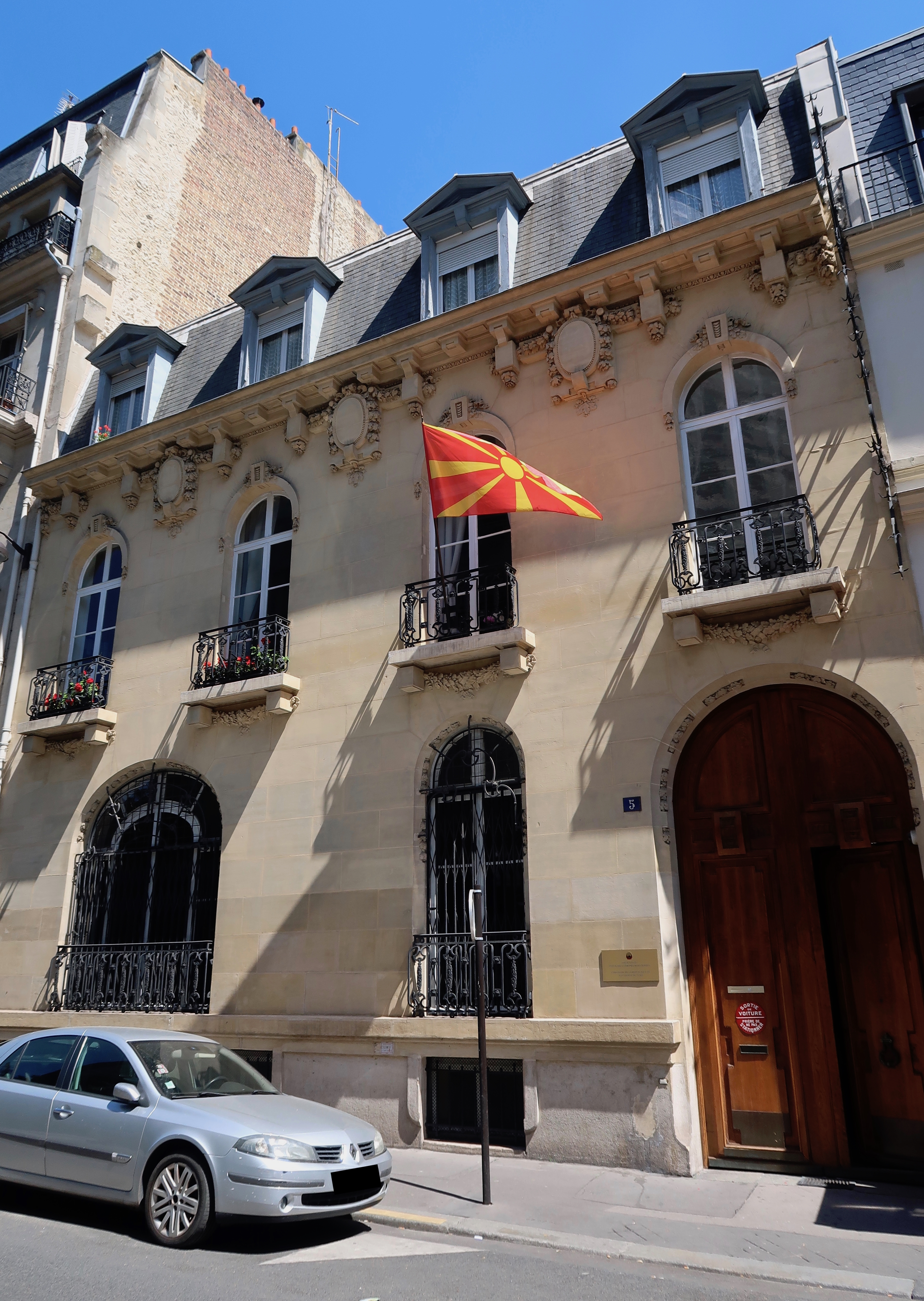
Embassy in Paris

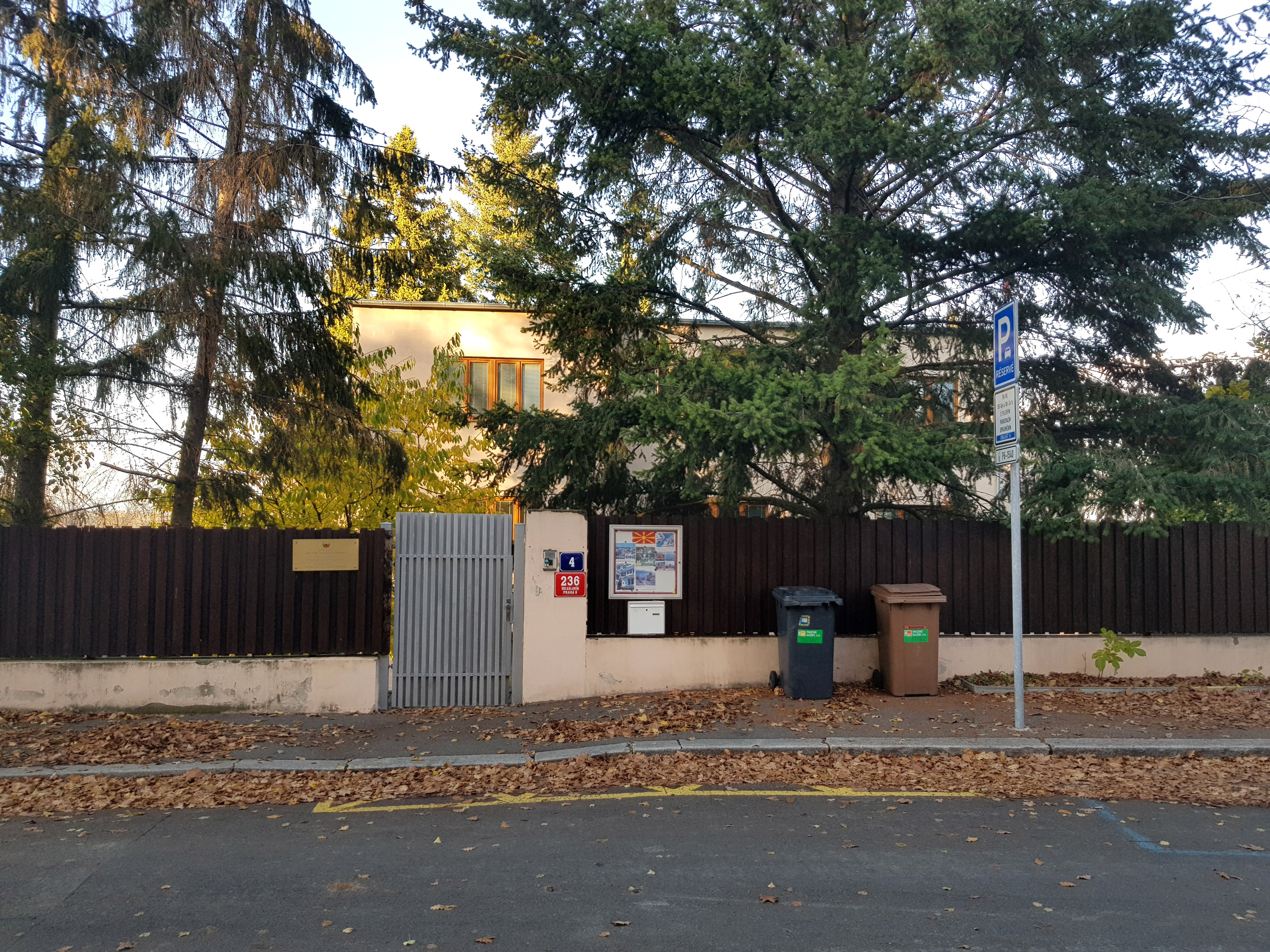
Embassy in Prague

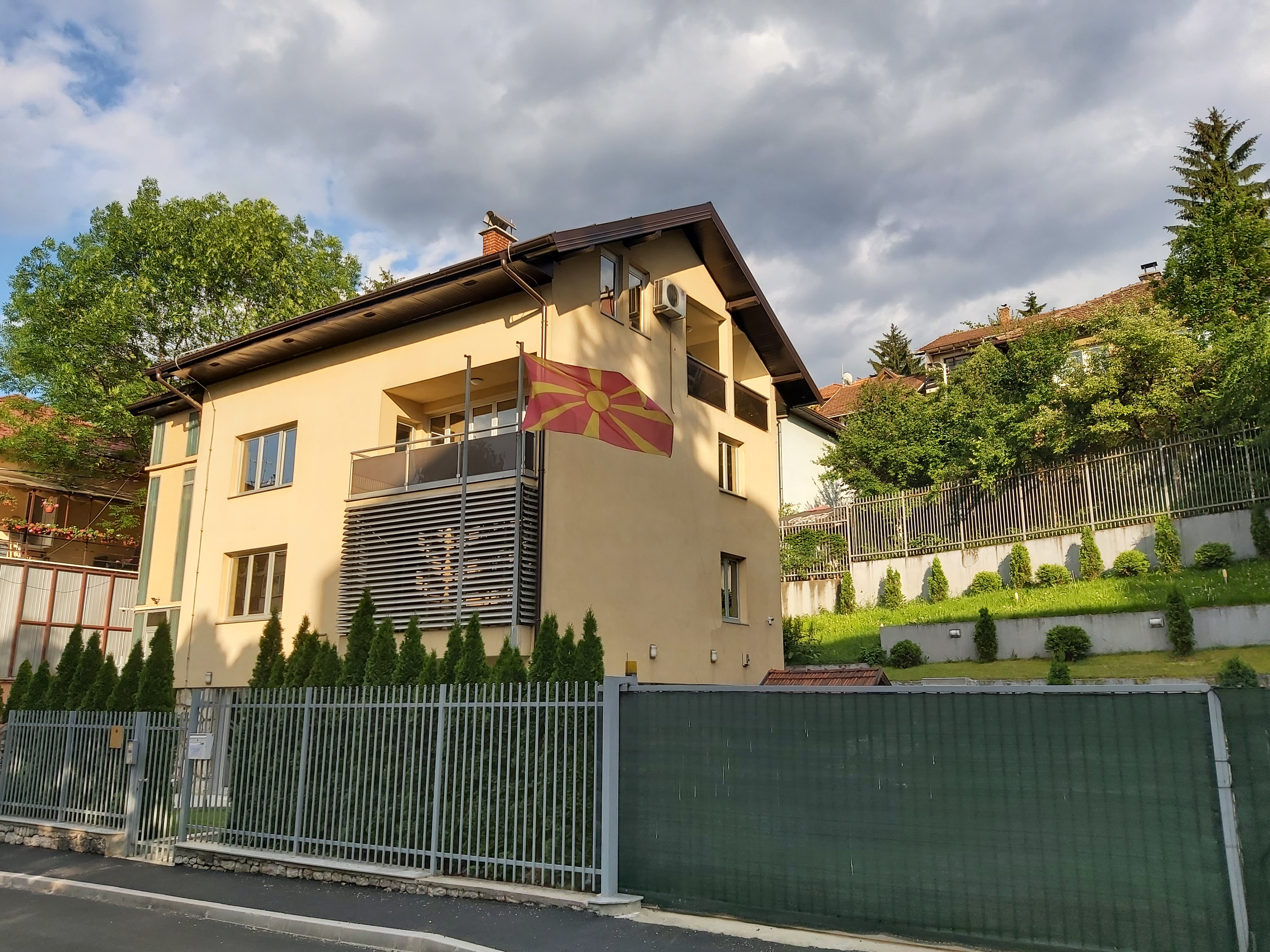
Embassy in Sarajevo

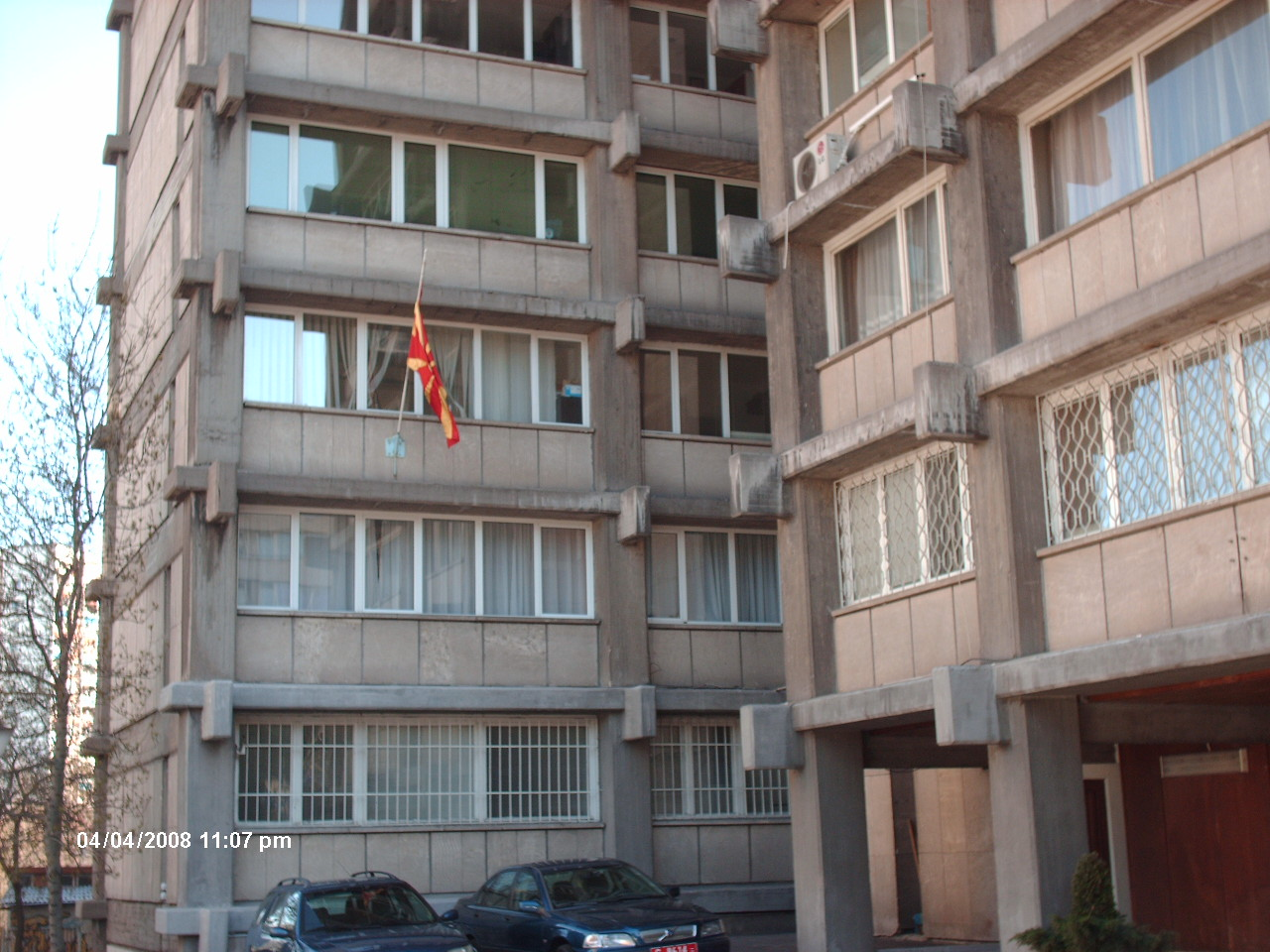
Embassy in Sofia

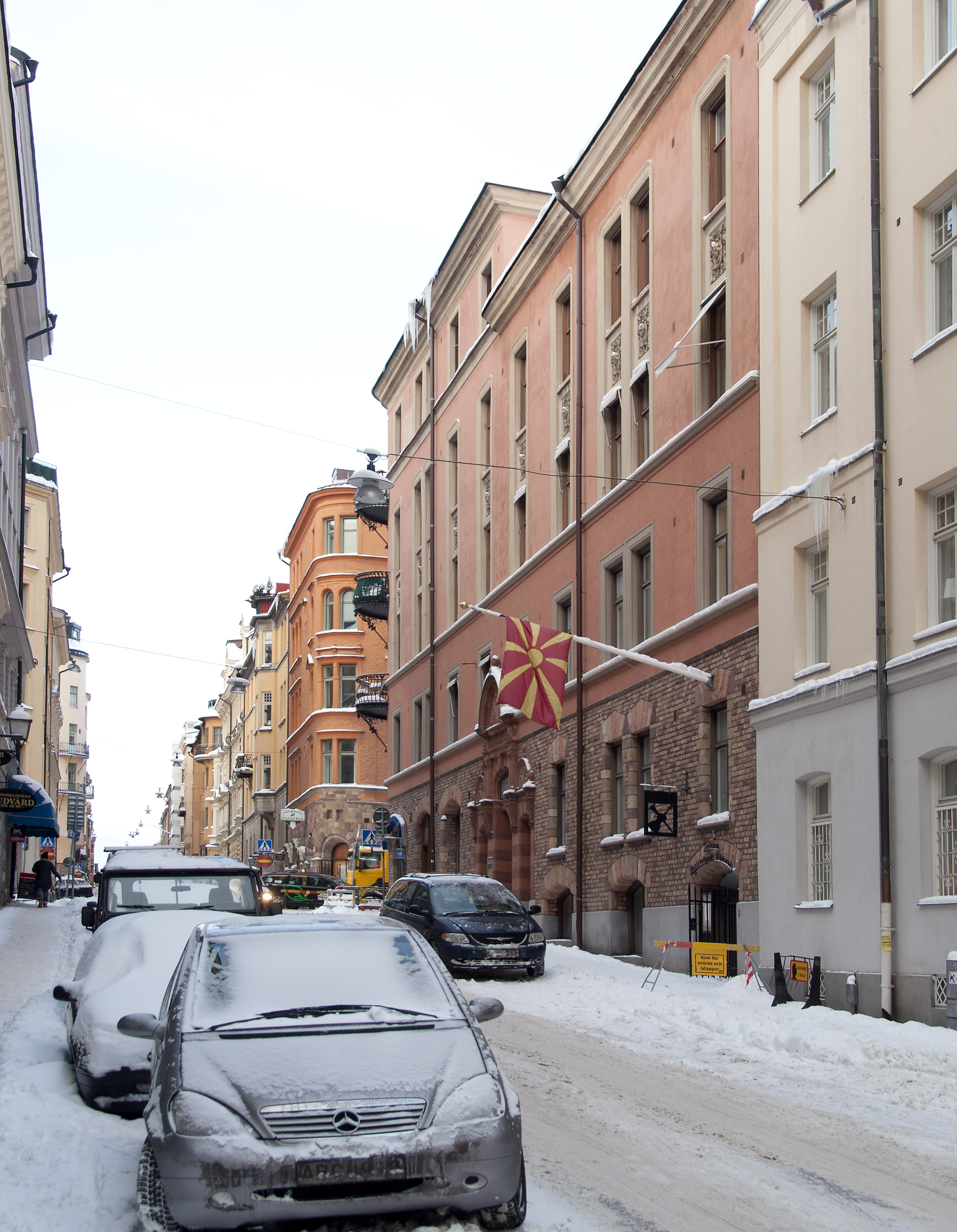
Embassy in Stockholm

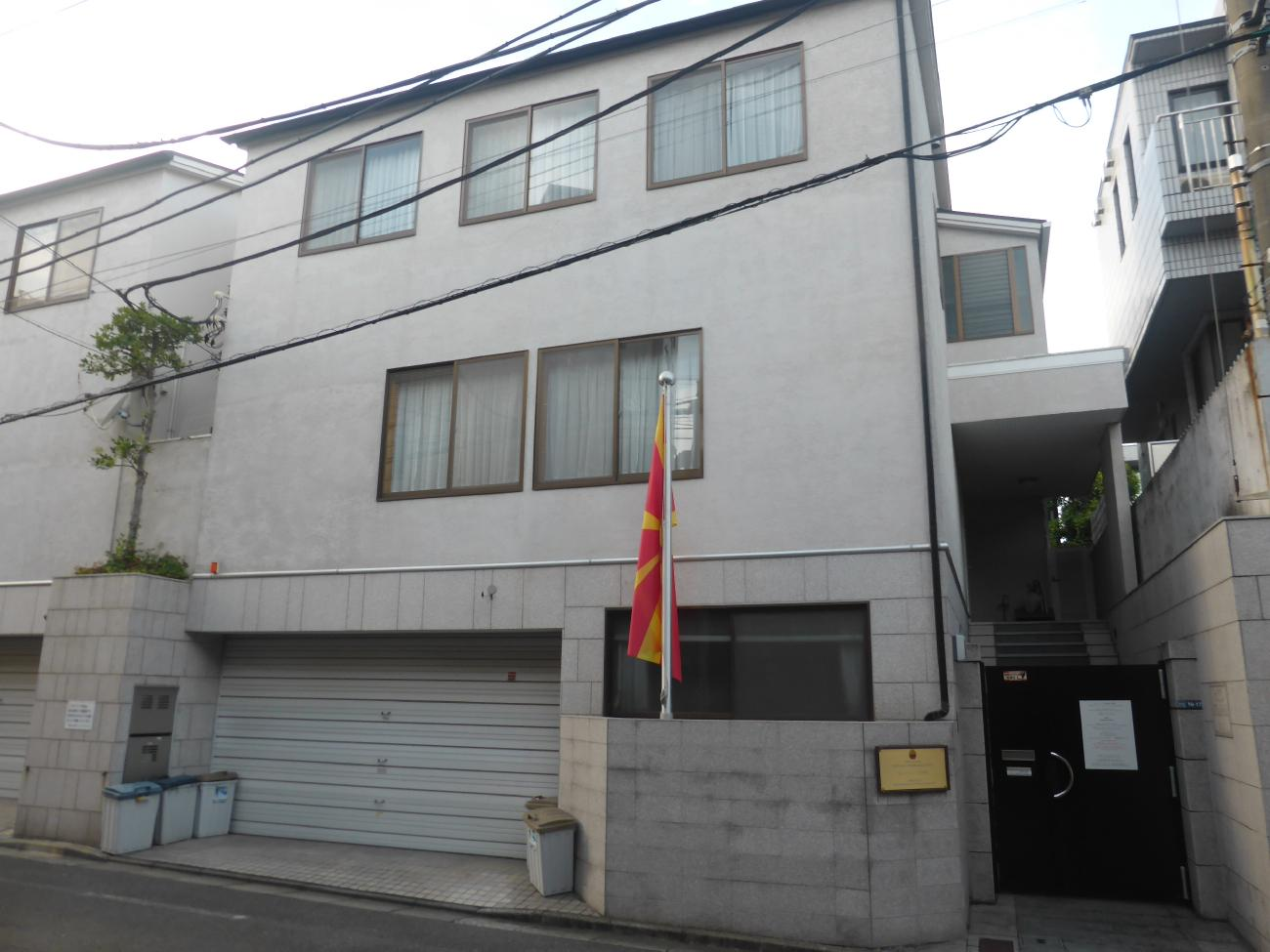
Embassy in Tokyo

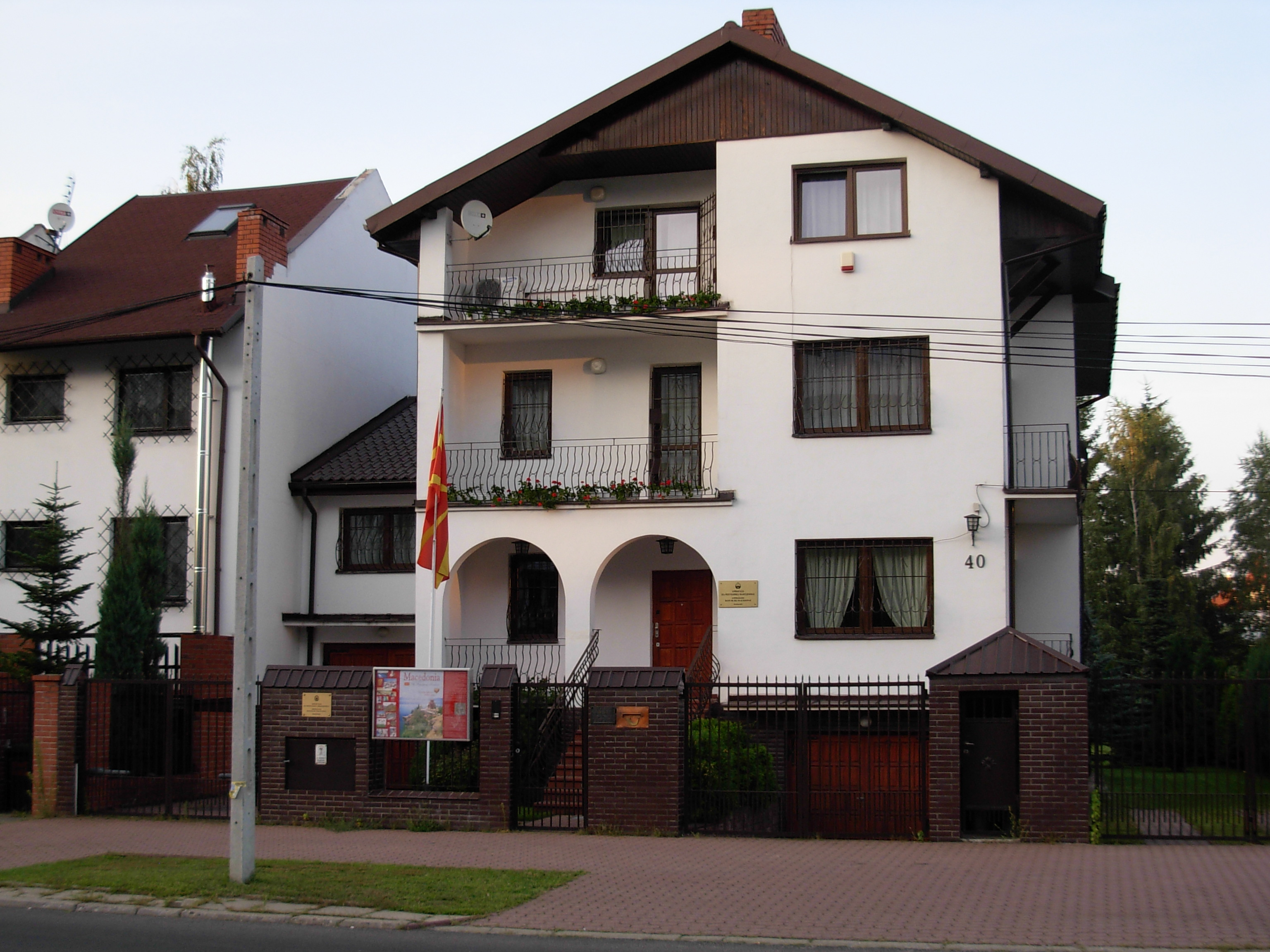
Embassy in Warsaw

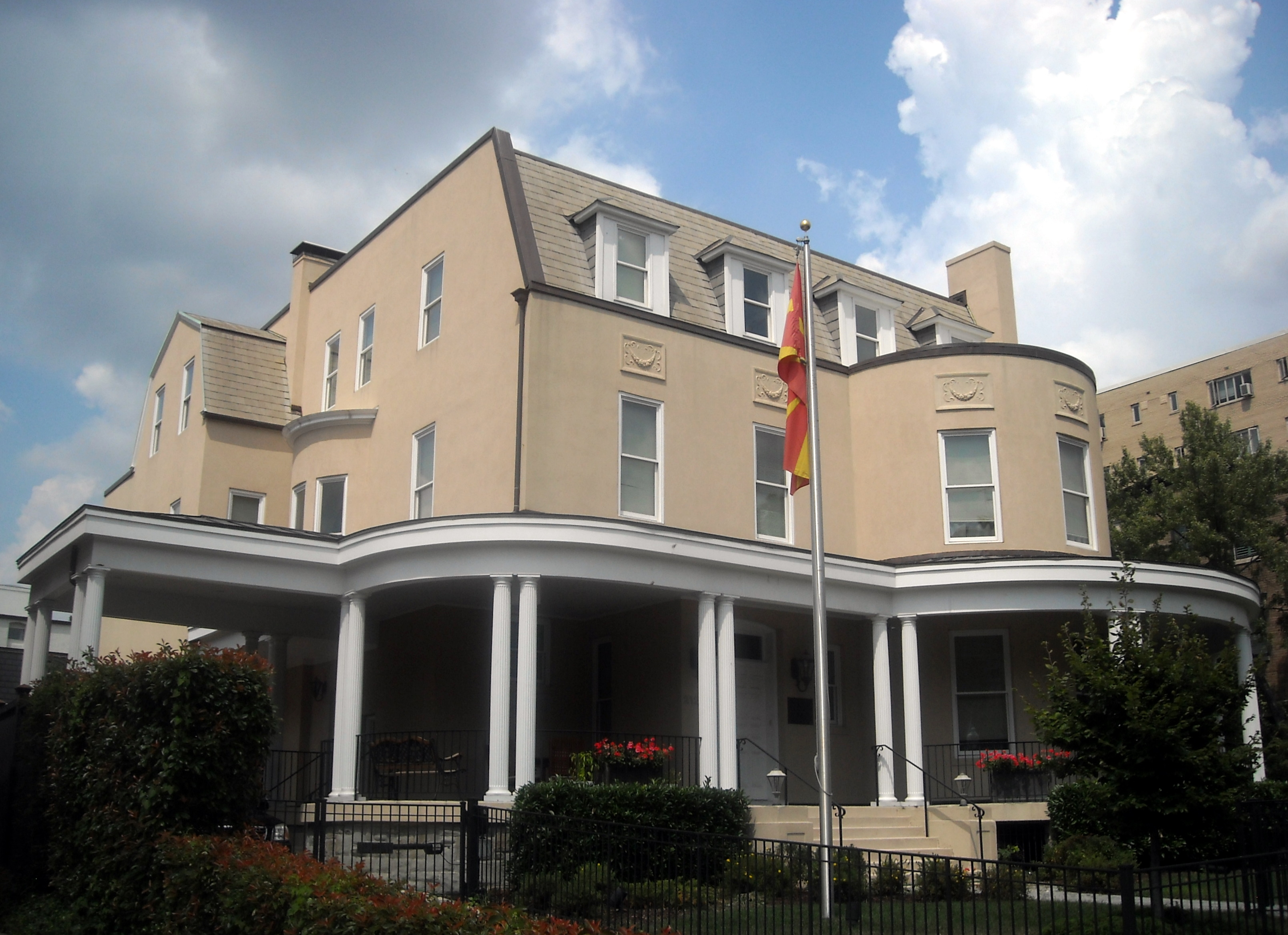
Embassy in Washington, D.C.

== Diplomatic mission to open ==
- Saudi Arabia
  - Riyadh (Embassy)

== See also ==
- List of diplomatic missions in North Macedonia
- Foreign relations of North Macedonia
