= List of ambassadors of North Macedonia to the United States =

Coordinates: 38.9177°N 77.0481°W

Ambassador of North Macedonia to the United States Embassy of North Macedonia in Washington, D.C.
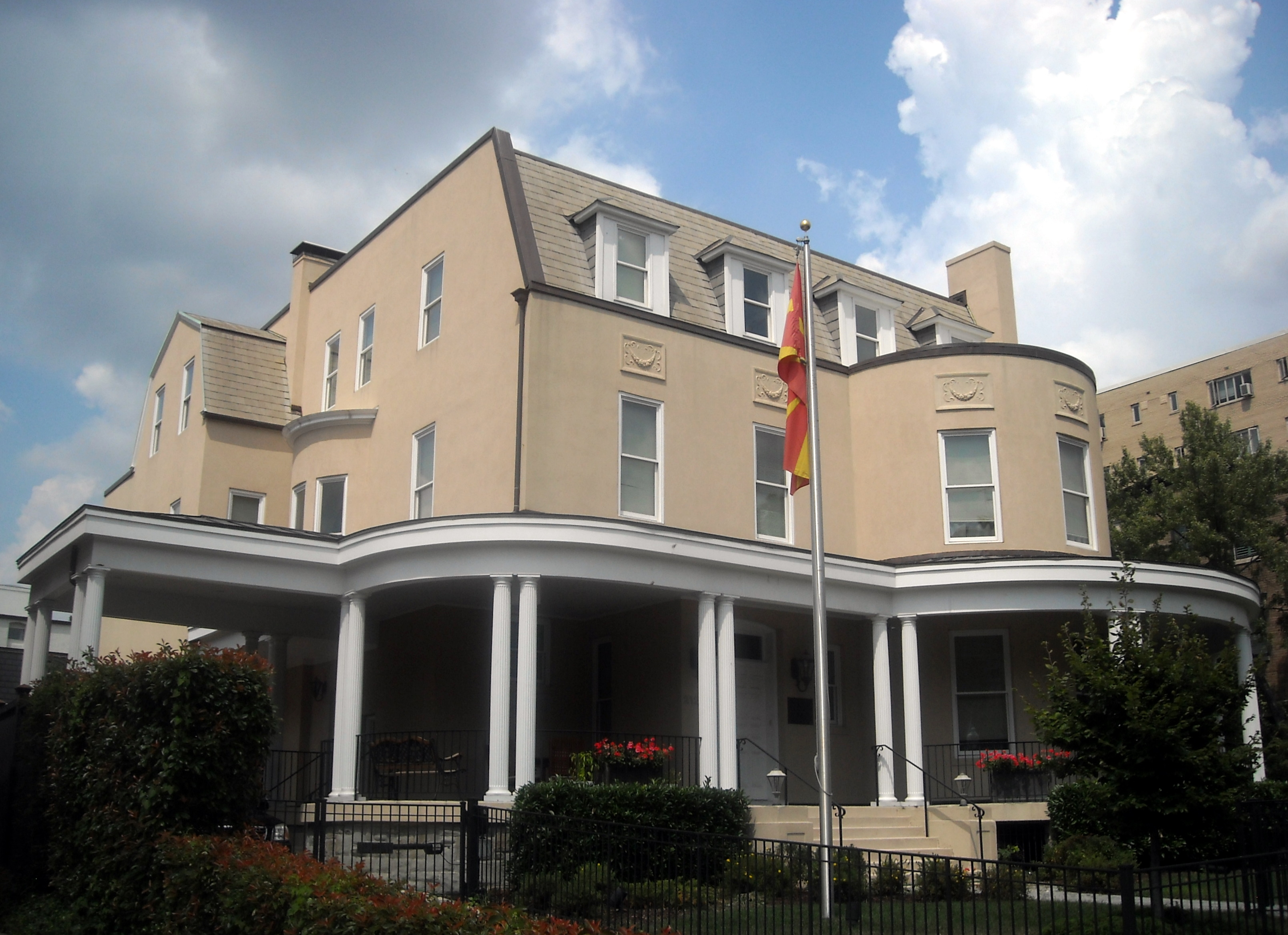
- Inaugural holder: Mihail K. Apostolski
- Formation: September 13, 1995

The North Macedonia ambassador in Washington, D.C. is the official representative of the Government of North Macedonia to the Government of the United States.

The United States formally recognized North Macedonia in 1994, with full diplomatic relations established in 1995. The embassy was formed and the first ambassador sent to the U.S. in the same year, as the administration of Bill Clinton recognized the government of Prime Minister Branko Crvenkovski in Skopje (North Macedonia).

== List of representatives ==
Diplomatic agrément	Diplomatic accreditation	Term end	Ambassador	Notes	Prime Minister of North Macedonia	List of presidents of the United States
September 13, 1995		February 6, 1996	Mihail K. Apostolski	Embassy Opened; Chargé d'affaires	Branko Crvenkovski	Bill Clinton
December 5, 1995	February 6, 1996	December 12, 2001	Ljubica Acevska		Branko Crvenkovski	Bill Clinton
November 30, 2001	December 12, 2001	July 6, 2006	Nikola Dimitrov		Ljubčo Georgievski	George W. Bush
December 13, 2006	July 6, 2006	July 25, 2007	Ljupčo Jordanovski	7. Oktober 2010 in Skopje	Vlado Bučkovski	George W. Bush
March 22, 2007	July 25, 2007	June 19, 2014	Zoran Jolevski		Nikola Gruevski	George W. Bush
June 19, 2014	November 1, 2014	October 1, 2018	Vasko Naumovski		Nikola Gruevski; Zoran Zaev	Barack Obama; Donald J Trump
August 1, 2022		Incumbent	Zoran Popov		Dimitar Kovačevski; Hristijan Mickoski	Joe Biden; Donald J Trump
