= Vasko Naumovski =

Macedonian diplomat and politician

His Excellency Vasko Naumovski Васко Наумовски
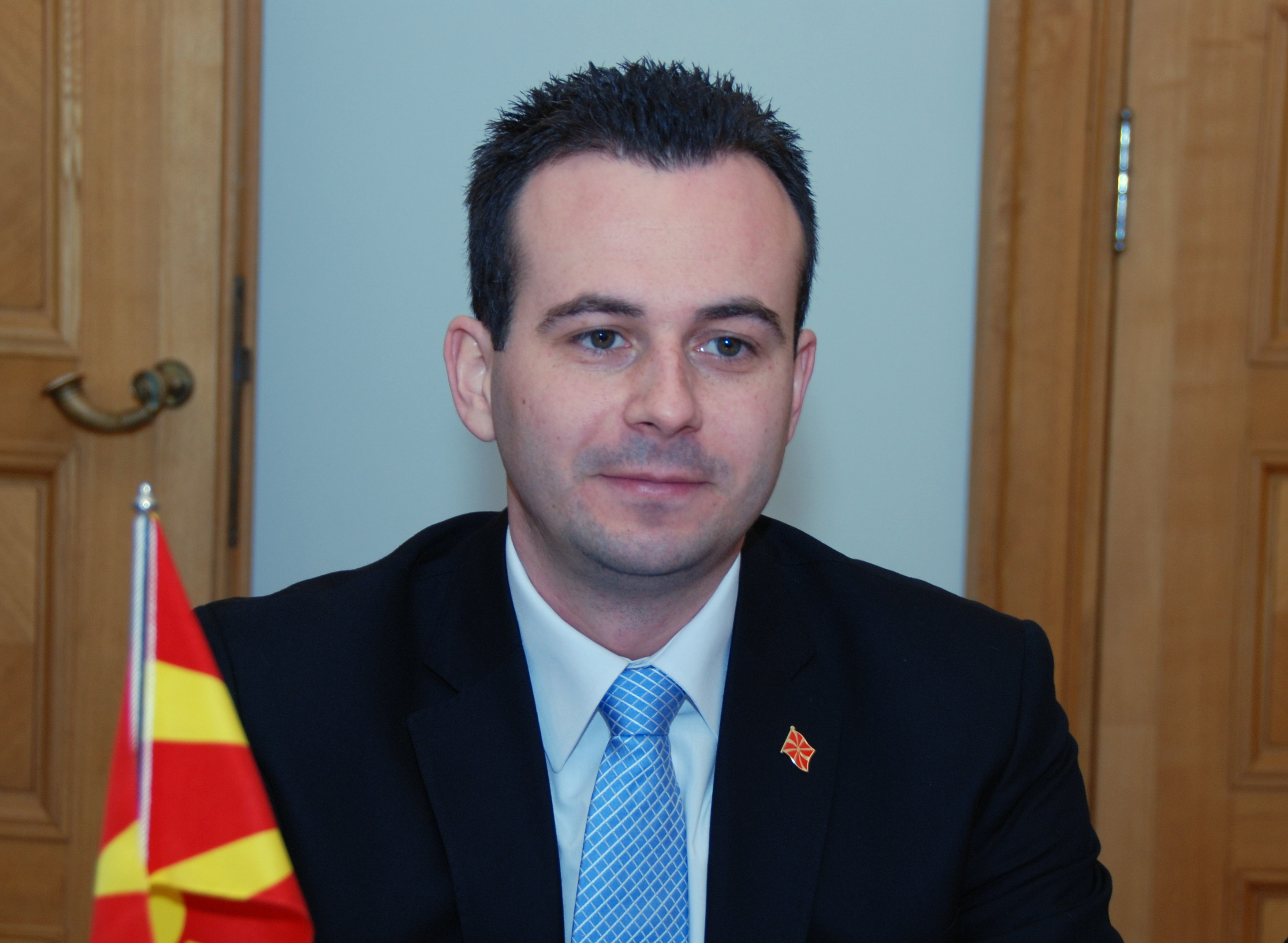

Macedonian Ambassador to the United States
- In office 19 June 2014 – 1 October 2018
- President: Gjorgje Ivanov
- Premier: Nikola Gruevski; Zoran Zaev
- Succeeded by: Zoran Popov
- Preceded by: Zoran Jolevski

Personal details
- Born: 1980 (age 45–46) Skopje, SR Macedonia, SFR Yugoslavia (now North Macedonia)
- Party: VMRO-DPMNE

Vasko Naumovski (Macedonian: Васко Наумовски; born 1980 in Skopje, Socialist Federal Republic of Yugoslavia) is a Macedonian diplomat and politician of VMRO-DPMNE, having served as a Deputy Prime Minister of the Republic of North Macedonia in Nikola Gruevski's government for the period of 2009–2011, responsible for the country's European integration.

In July 2014, the President of the Republic of North Macedonia, Gjorge Ivanov appointed Naumovski to be the country's Ambassador to the United States and special envoy in the talks over the Macedonia Naming Dispute which are conducted under the auspices of the United Nations. In October 2018, Naumovski was given a farewell celebration by the U.S. Department of State, indicating his imminent departure from the post.
