= Boris Trajanov =

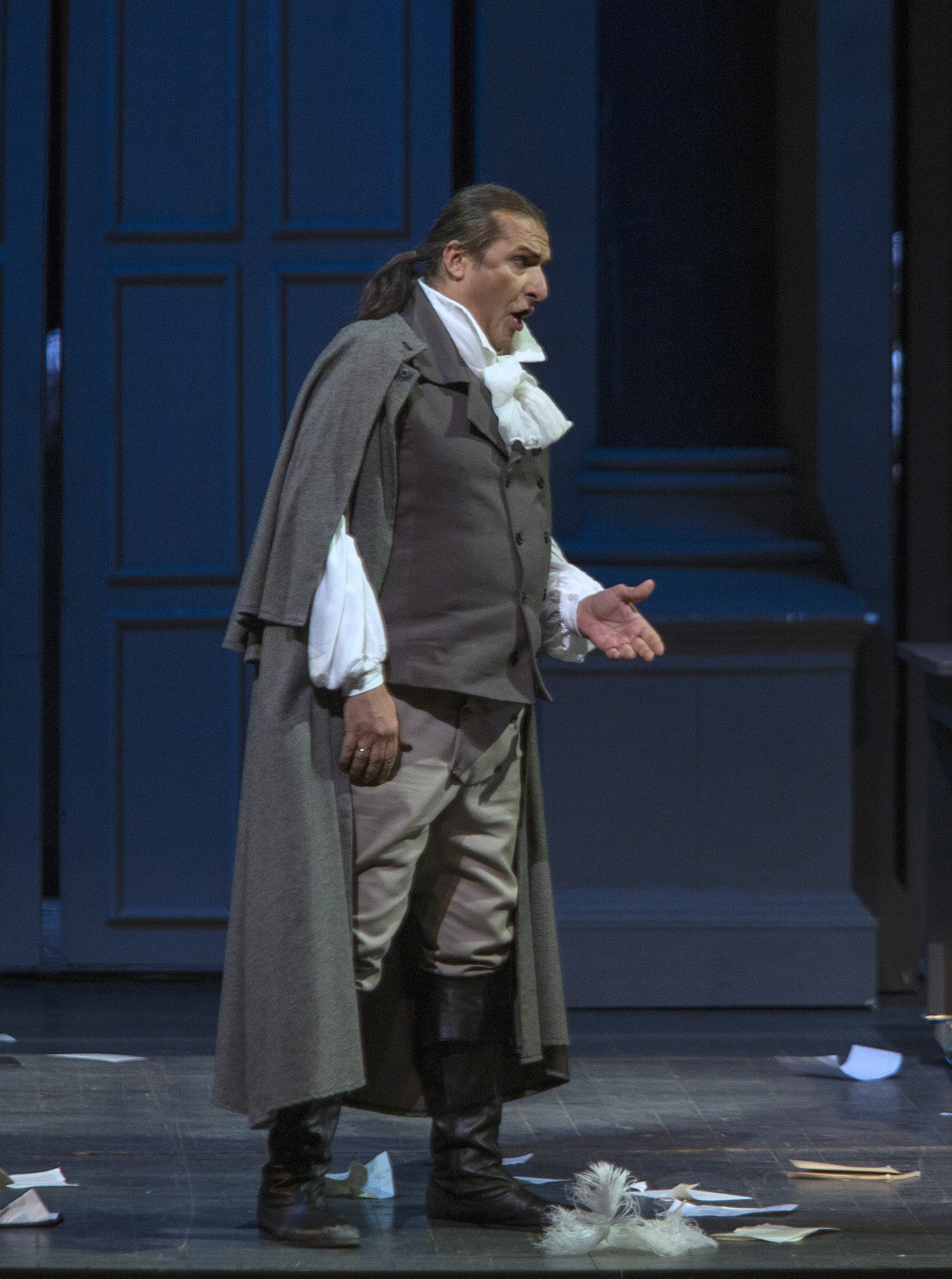
Boris Trajanov

Boris Trajanov (Macedonian: Борис Трајанов, born in Ljubljana, 1959) is a Macedonian operatic baritone.

At the beginning, he studied singing with his father Goga Trajanov in Skopje. He continued his studies with Biserka Cvejic in Belgrade and Pier Miranda Ferraro in Milan. He made his stage debut in 1986 in the operetta The Gypsy Baron. The same year followed his operatic debut as Enrico Ashton in Donizetti's Lucia di Lammermoor.

In his career of over 30 years, he sang in more than 700 Performances in around 100 opera stages around the world, appearing in 43 main baritone roles. His is widely regarded as one of the best interpreters of the role of Scarpia in Puccini's Tosca. His wide repertoire contains the most important roles from Verdi's operas, such as Nabucco, Conte di Luna, Rigoletto, Rodrigo Posa, Macbeth, Ezio, Renato, Iago, Don Carlo, Giorgio Germont. He appeared also as Don Pizarro in Fidelio, Guglielmo in Maria Stuarda, Escamillo in Carmen, Prince Yeletsky in The Queen of Spades, Sharpless in Madama Butterfly, Gerard in Andrea Chénier, Alfio in Cavalleria Rusticana.

In 2005 Boris Trajanov became an UNESCO Artist for Peace.

In 2014 he became a National Artist of Republic of North Macedonia.

== Treeday in the Republic of Macedonia ==
Boris Trajanov has launched an initiative to plant 2 million trees throughout the country's mountains, one for each citizen of Macedonia. The initiative got the name treeday (Ден на дрвото). About 200 seedlings were already planted earlier in the year at Breznica, near Skopje, an area ravaged by a large forest fire the previous summer. On 12 March 2008 more than 2 million seedlings were planted in many places around the country. About 200,000 people, or 10% of the total population, went out to help the initiative. Another more massive initiative has been planned for the autumn and six million seedlings are about to be planted on 19 November 2008. The plan is to make the initiative widely spread, starting with an idea to make a Balkan treeday. Later maybe European or global...
