= Embassy of North Macedonia, Washington, D.C. =

Embassy of North Macedonia
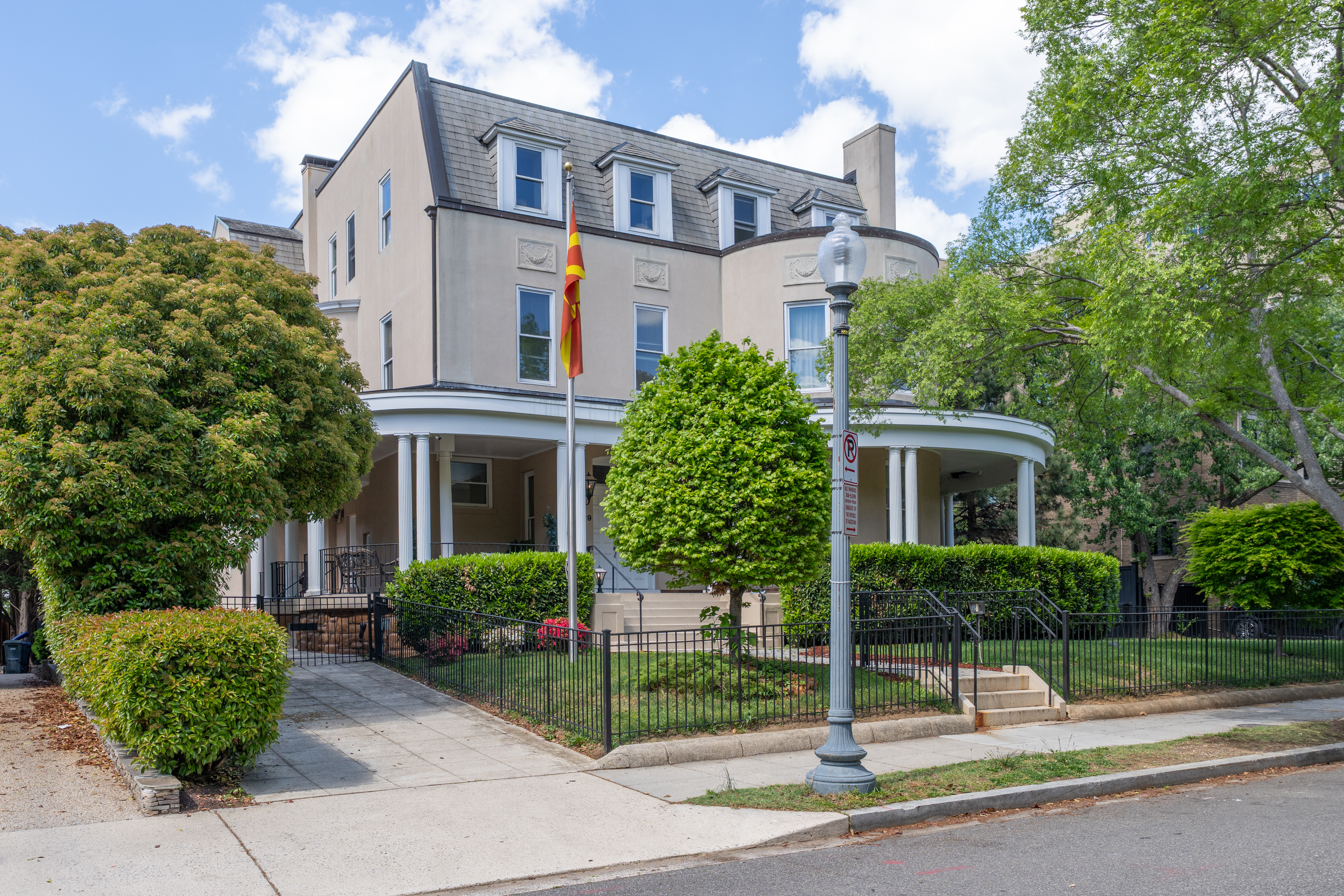
- Location: Washington, D.C.
- Address: 2129 Wyoming Avenue, N.W.
- Coordinates: 38°55′3.72″N 77°2′53.16″W
- Ambassador: Zoran Popov

The Embassy of North Macedonia in Washington, D.C., also known as the Moses House, is the diplomatic mission of North Macedonia to the United States.

The embassy is located at 2129 Wyoming Avenue Northwest, in the Kalorama neighborhood of Washington, D.C. The current ambassador of North Macedonia to the United States is Zoran Popov.

== History ==
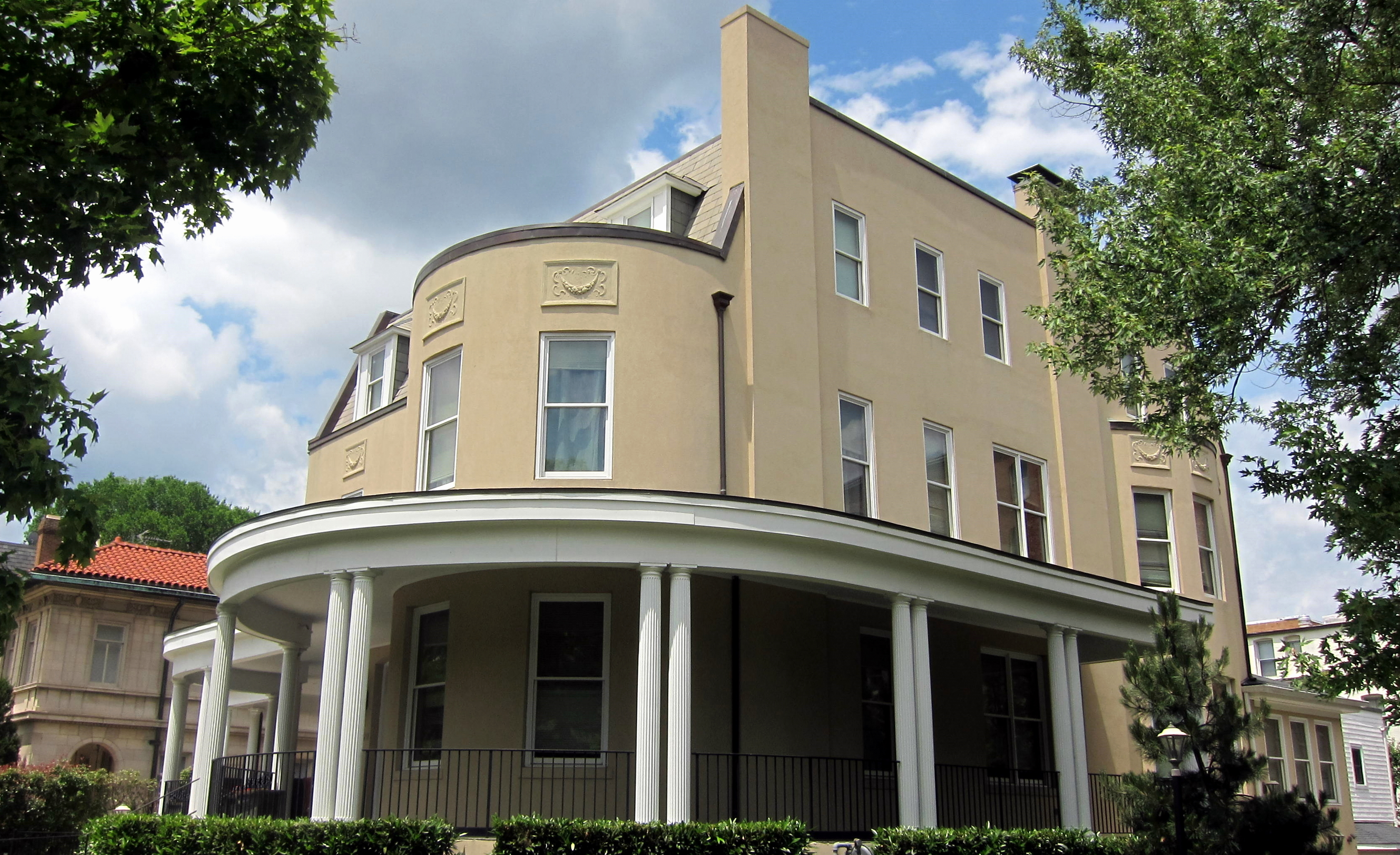
The house in 2010

The Moses House was constructed in 1893 and is a mixture of Queen Anne and Neoclassical architecture. The house was designed by architect Thomas Franklin Schneider, and is the oldest standing building in the Kalorama neighborhood. The building was owned by businessman W. H. Moses until it was sold and converted into the Embassy of France in the 1940s. When the French diplomatic mission moved to a new location in 1984, the house sat empty for 20 years until it was purchased by the government of North Macedonia. Moses House was renovated and opened as the Embassy of North Macedonia on October 26, 2005.

== Popular culture ==
The embassy is used in the story Crossings by Danielle Steel, where the French ambassador to the United States Armand DeVilliers resides and is preparing to go back to France with his American-born wife Liane DeVilliers in June 1939.

== See also ==
- Foreign relations of North Macedonia
- List of diplomatic missions in Washington, D.C.
- List of diplomatic missions of North Macedonia
- List of ambassadors of North Macedonia to the United States
- North Macedonia–United States relations
