= Ljupčo Jordanovski =

Macedonian seismologist and politician

- Љупчо Јордановски

Acting President of Macedonia
- In office 26 February 2004 – 12 May 2004
- Prime Minister: Radmila Šekerinska (acting)
- Preceded by: Boris Trajkovski
- Succeeded by: Branko Crvenkovski

Speaker of the Assembly of the Republic of Macedonia
- In office 8 November 2003 – 1 August 2006
- Preceded by: Nikola Popovski
- Succeeded by: Ljubisha Georgievski

Personal details
- Born: Ljupčo Jordanovski; 13 February 1953 Štip, FPR Yugoslavia
- Died: 7 October 2010 (aged 57) Skopje, Republic of Macedonia
- Party: Social Democratic Union of Macedonia
- Education: University of Zagreb; University of Southern California
- Occupation: Politician

Ljupčo Jordanovski (Macedonian: Љупчо Јордановски, pronounced [ʎupt͡ʃɔ jɔrdanɔfski]; 13 February 1953 – 7 October 2010) was a Macedonian seismologist and politician.

== Education background ==
Jordanovski was born in Štip. He received his BEng in Electrical Engineering from the University of Zagreb. He received his PhD from the University of Southern California in 1985.

== Political activities ==
He was a member of the Social Democratic Union of Macedonia party. He took office as Speaker of the Assembly on 18 November 2003. As Speaker of the Assembly, according to the Republic of Macedonia's constitution he was the successor to the president in the event of the president's inability to serve.

=== Acting President of Macedonia ===
Accordingly, when President Boris Trajkovski was killed in a plane crash on 26 February 2004, Jordanovski was sworn in as president.

He was the acting president of the Republic of Macedonia from 26 February 2004 to 12 May 2004. He left office after presidential elections in which he did not run. He continued in his role as Speaker after his time as acting president, until 2 August 2006.

=== Ambassador to the United States ===
On 6 July 2006 he was accredited as the Ambassador of the Republic of Macedonia to the United States of America, but at the end of December he was recalled by the Government of the Republic of Macedonia. He died unexpectedly in Skopje.

Political offices
Preceded by Boris Trajkovski	President of Macedonia; Acting; 2004	Succeeded by Branko Crvenkovski
Preceded by Nikola Popovski	Speaker of the Assembly of the Republic of Macedonia; 2003–2006	Succeeded by Ljubiša Georgievski
