= Prespa Agreement =

2018 settlement of the Macedonia naming dispute

Final Agreement for the settlement of the differences as described in the United Nations Security Council Resolutions 817 (1993) and 845 (1993), the termination of the Interim Accord of 1995, and the establishment of a Strategic Partnership between the Parties
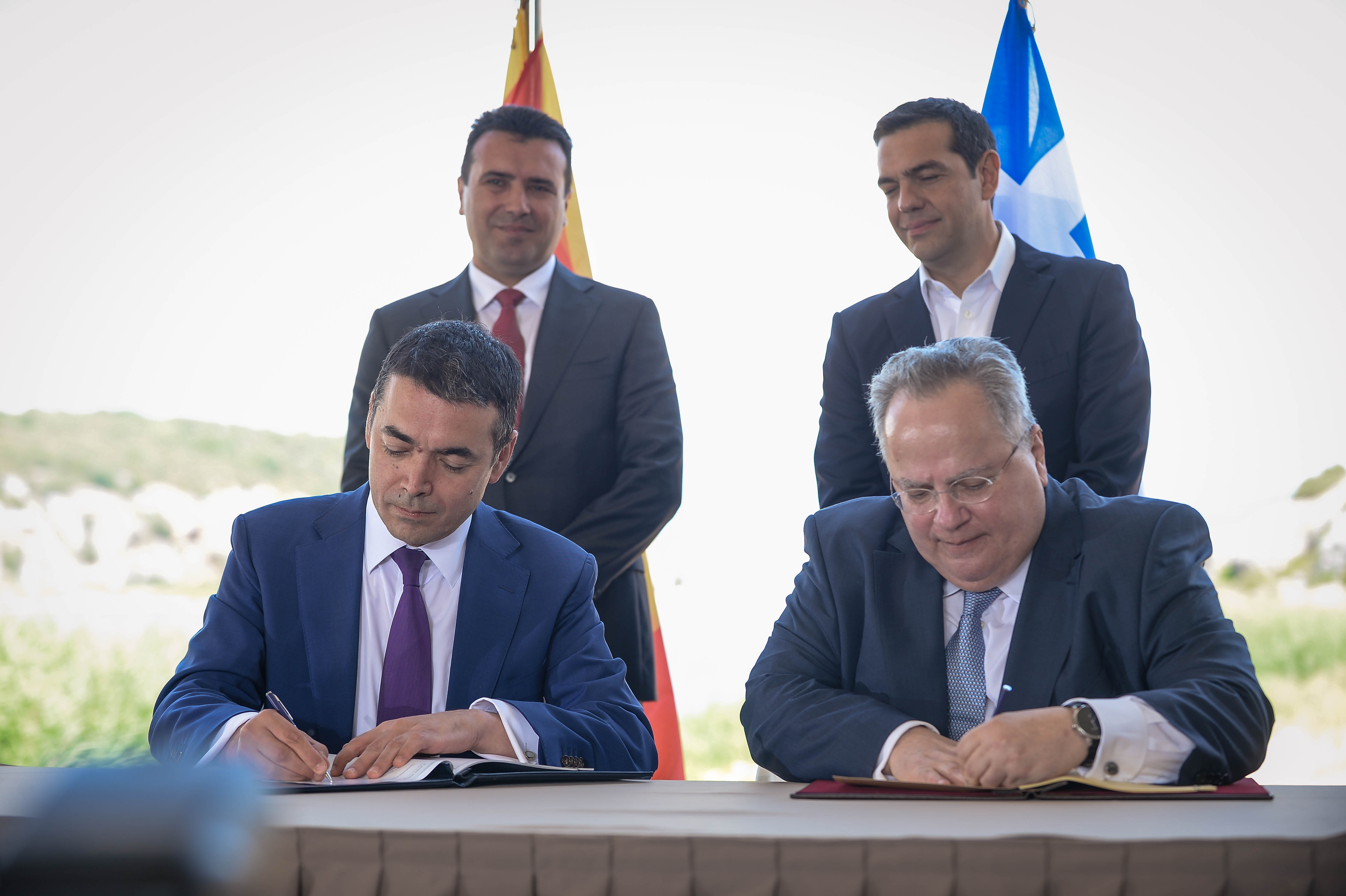
- The foreign ministers of the two countries, Nikola Dimitrov and Nikos Kotzias, sign the agreement before Prime Ministers Zoran Zaev and Alexis Tsipras
- Signed: 17 June 2018
- Location: Psarades, Greece
- Sealed: 25 January 2019
- Effective: 12 February 2019
- Condition: Ratification of the agreement by both parliaments as well as ratification of the Republic of North Macedonia's NATO accession protocol by Greece
- Signatories: Nikos Kotzias; Nikola Dimitrov; Matthew Nimetz
- Parties: Hellenic Republic; Republic of Macedonia
- Language: English

Full text
- Prespa agreement at Wikisource

Geographic and political division of Macedonia North Macedonia Macedonia (Greece)

The Prespa Agreement, (Note: In Greek: Συμφωνία των Πρεσπών, romanized: Symfonia ton Prespon; In Macedonian: Договорот од Преспа, romanized: Dogovorot od Prespa or Преспански договор, Prespanski dogovor) also known as the Treaty of Prespa, the Prespes deal or the Prespa accord, is an agreement reached in 2018 between Greece and the then-Republic of Macedonia, under the auspices of the United Nations, resolving a long-standing naming dispute between the two countries. Apart from resolving the terminological differences, the agreement also covers areas of cooperation between the two countries in order to establish a strategic partnership.

Signed beside the shared Lake Prespa, from which it took its name, and ratified by the parliaments of both countries, the agreement went into force on 12 February 2019, when the two countries notified the UN of the deal's completion, following the ratification of the NATO accession protocol for North Macedonia on 8 February. It replaces the Interim Accord of 1995 and sees the Republic of Macedonia's constitutional name changed to the Republic of North Macedonia erga omnes.

== Name of the agreement ==
The Prespa Agreement is the short, informal name for the agreement, named after the place where it was signed, Lake Prespa. Its full name is Final Agreement for the settlement of the differences as described in the United Nations Security Council resolutions 817 (1993) and 845 (1993), the termination of the Interim Accord of 1995, and the establishment of a strategic partnership between the Parties.

- Greek: Τελική συμφωνία για την επίλυση των διαφορών, όπως περιγράφονται στις αποφάσεις του Συμβουλίου Ασφαλείας των Ηνωμένων Εθνών 817 (1993) και 845 (1993), τη λήξη της Ενδιάμεσης Συμφωνίας του 1995, και την εδραίωση στρατηγικής εταιρικής σχέσης μεταξύ των μερών, romanized: Telikí symfonía gia tin epílysi ton diaforón, ópos perigráfontai stis apofáseis tou Symvoulíou Asfaleías ton Inoménon Ethnón 817 (1993) kai 845 (1993), ti líxi tis Endiámesis Symfonías tou 1995, kai tin edraíosi stratigikís etairikís schésis metaxý ton merón
- Macedonian: Конечна спогодба за решавање на разликите како што е опишано во резолуциите 817 (1993) и 845 (1993) на Советот за безбедност на Обединетите нации, раскинување на Времената спогодба од 1995 година и воспоставување на стратешко партнерство меѓу Страните, romanized: Konečna spogodba za rešavanje na razlikite kako što e opišano vo rezoluciite 817 (1993) i 845 (1993) na Sovetot za bezbednost na Obedinetite nacii, raskinuvanje na Vremenata spogodba od 1995 godina i vospostavuvanje na strateško partnerstvo meǵu Stranite

== Background ==
Following the breakup of Yugoslavia in 1991, use of the name "Macedonia" was disputed between the Southeastern European countries of Greece and the then-Republic of Macedonia. The dispute arose from the ambiguity in nomenclature between the former Yugoslav republic, the adjacent Greek region of Macedonia, and the ancient kingdom of Macedon. Citing historical and irredentist concerns, Greece opposed the use of the name "Macedonia" by the Republic of Macedonia without a geographical qualifier like "Northern" or "Upper" for use "by all... and for all purposes".

Approximately two million ethnic Greeks identify themselves as Macedonians who typically view themselves as being unrelated to the ethnic Macedonians. Consequently, Greece further objected to the use of the term "Macedonian" for the neighboring country's largest ethnic group and its language. Greece further accused the Republic of Macedonia of appropriating symbols and figures that are historically considered part of Greek culture, such as the Vergina Sun and Alexander the Great. Moreover, Greece claimed that the Republic of Macedonia was promoting the irredentist concept of a United Macedonia, which involves territorial claims on Greece, Bulgaria, Albania, and Serbia.

Prior to the Prespa agreement, international organizations provisionally referenced the Republic of Macedonia as "the former Yugoslav Republic of Macedonia" (sometimes abbreviated as "FYROM").

== Contents of the agreement ==
The agreement provides that the Republic of Macedonia takes the name of Republic of North Macedonia (Macedonian: Република Северна Македонија, romanized: Republika Severna Makedonija; Greek: Δημοκρατία της Βόρειας Μακεδονίας). This new name is to be used for all purposes (erga omnes), that is, domestically, in all bilateral relations and in all regional and international organizations and institutions.

The deal includes recognition of the Macedonian language in the United Nations, noting that it is within the group of South Slavic languages, and that the nationality of the country will be called Macedonian/citizen of the Republic of North Macedonia. Also, there is an explicit clarification that the citizens of the country are not related to the ancient Hellenic civilization that inhabited the northern regions of modern-day Greece. Specifically, Article 7 mentions that both countries acknowledge that their respective understanding of the terms "Macedonia" and "Macedonian" refers to a different historical context and cultural heritage. When reference is made to Greece, these terms denote the area and people of its northern region, as well as the Hellenic civilization, history and culture of that region. When reference is made to the Republic of North Macedonia, these terms denote its territory, language and people, with their own, distinctly different, history and culture.

Additionally, the agreement stipulates the removal of the Vergina Sun from public use in the Republic of North Macedonia and the formation of a committee for the review of school textbooks and maps in both countries for the removal of irredentist content and to align them with UNESCO and Council of Europe standards.

== Reactions ==
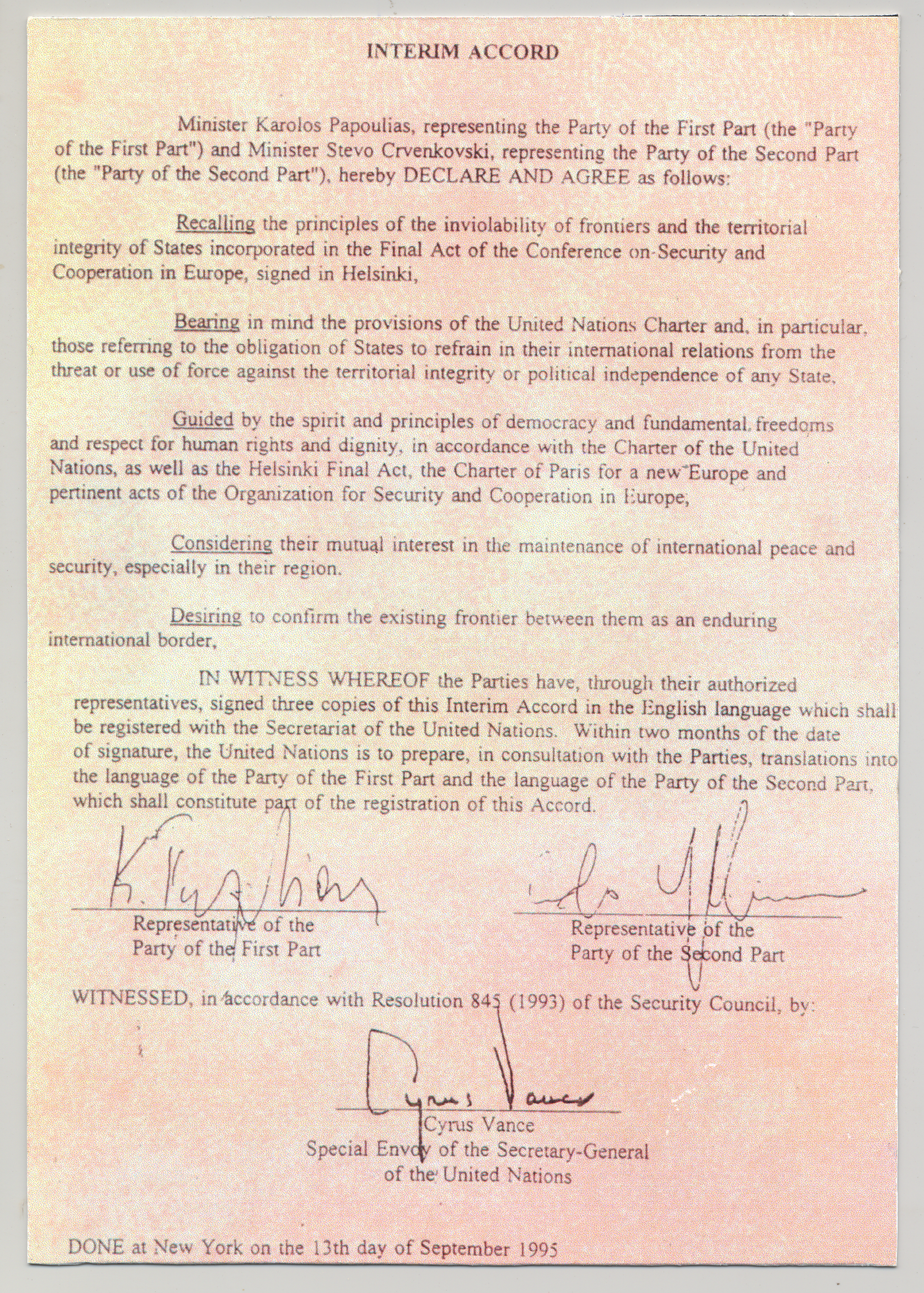
The Interim Accord of 1995, which was superseded by the Prespa agreement in 2019

The Greek Prime Minister Alexis Tsipras announced on 12 June 2018 that an agreement had been reached with his Macedonian counterpart Zoran Zaev on the dispute, "which covers all the preconditions set by the Greek side". The agreement was signed at Lake Prespa, a body of water which forms a partial common border between the Republic of North Macedonia, Greece and Albania.

=== Political reactions ===
The international community reacted positively to the Prespa agreement, with the media dubbing it as "historic". The European Union welcomed it, with the European Council President Donald Tusk tweeting his "sincere congratulations" to Tsipras and Zaev. "I am keeping my fingers crossed. Thanks to you, the impossible is becoming possible," he said. EU Foreign Affairs chief Federica Mogherini and commissioner Johannes Hahn also issued a joint statement congratulating the two prime ministers "in reaching this historic agreement between their countries, which contributes to the transformation of the entire region of Southeast Europe." NATO Secretary General Jens Stoltenberg welcomed the agreement, stating that it will set the Republic of Macedonia on the path towards NATO membership. Additionally, the British Foreign Minister Boris Johnson welcomed the agreement as being "fantastic news". "The agreement once and for always confirms and strengthens the Macedonian ethnic and cultural identity, the Macedonian language, the Macedonian nationality. It guarantees the security of the country and provides a secure future for the citizens of the Republic of Macedonia", Zaev said.

The domestic communities of both countries reacted more negatively to the agreement. In Macedonia, the President of the Republic, Gjorge Ivanov, declared that he would not sign the agreement, calling it "disastrous". Additionally, VMRO-DPMNE, the main conservative party at the time, also opposed the agreement, and pledged to organize public protests against it. In Macedonia, protests became violent at Skopje, and Macedonian SDSM MP Hari Lokvenec, who attended the Prespa ceremony, had his parliamentary vehicle set on fire at Bitola by unidentified perpetrators.

In Greece, the conservative New Democracy party filed a motion of no-confidence against Tsipras in parliament because of the agreement, which was rejected two days later with a simple parliamentary majority of 153 against and 127 for. Kyriakos Mitsotakis, leader of the New Democracy party, had argued in this connection that the Greek foreign minister (and hence the government of Syriza) had no authority to sign the agreement, based on international legal arguments that were responded to by legal scholars.. Additionally PASOK and the Communist Party of Greece (CPG), a far-left party, opposed the agreement.

Golden Dawn (GD), a far-right party, opposed the agreement, with a Golden Dawn MP, Konstantinos Barbarousis, calling for military rule and firing squads to execute politicians responsible for the deal. As a result, Barbarousis was expelled from his party, and a warrant was issued for his arrest for high treason. He fled using his parliamentary vehicle but eventually was found and arrested.

Following his departure as Greek foreign minister, Kotzias stated in October 2018 that key reasons for the Prespa agreement were to bring stability to the Balkans and to stop Turkish influence within the region.

=== Public reactions ===
In Greece, the deeply unpopular agreement had an instant negative impact on Tsipras's chances of staying in power. According to separate polls conducted by Marc and Ekathimerini, between 65% and 68% of Greeks were against the Prespes deal and what was contained within it. There were large public demonstrations in 2018 and 2019 against the Prespes deal in Athens and Thessaloniki that lasted days. There were also vast student sit-ins which affected 210 schools in Greek Central Macedonia alone. Despite the uproar, the protesters were accused of having links with the far-right/fascists. In response, famous composer and leftist Mikis Theodorakis, who was also against the Prespes deal, called the Syriza government 'left-wing fascists'. During the ratification of the Prespes deal (2018-19), fake news promoted a possible territorial loss of Greek Macedonia and a sense of victimization and dehumanization that demanded emergency actions to protect Greece from North Macedonia and its Greek assistants. Furthermore, the Greek news coverage showed that several news stories tried to undermine the country's then-government.

In North Macedonia, the majority of public perception was also against the deal but not to the same extent as the Greek public. According to polls conducted by Sitel TV, 45% of the public stated they felt negatively towards the deal while 44% said they felt positively towards it. Around half (50.5%) of those surveyed said they thought the government in Skopje did a good job during the negotiations with Greece against 40.7% who said it did not.

A June 2020 poll in North Macedonia, conducted by the National Democratic Institute, showed that 58% of Macedonians support the Prespa agreement and that there is also strong public support for the country's Euro-Atlantic direction, with 74% positive opinions for NATO (of which North Macedonia has been a member since 27 March 2020) and 79% positive opinions for accession to the European Union.

An October 2020 poll conducted in Greece by the Friedrich Naumann Foundation in cooperation with the KAPA Research, shows that the Prespa Agreement is becoming increasingly accepted in Greece, with the majority (58%) of the Greeks viewing it positively; 25% consider it to be a good agreement, while 33% view it as an agreement with several compromises but necessary (up from 18% and 24% respectively in 2018).

== Signing ==
The Prespa Agreement in full (all 14 pages)

The Prespa agreement, which replaced the Interim Accord of 1995, was signed on 17 June 2018 in a high-level ceremony at the Greek border village of Psarades on Lake Prespa, by the two foreign ministers Nikola Dimitrov and Nikos Kotzias and in the presence of the respective prime Ministers, Zoran Zaev and Alexis Tsipras. The meeting was attended by the UN's Special Representative Matthew Nimetz, the Under-Secretary-General for Political Affairs Rosemary DiCarlo, the EU's High Representative of the Union for Foreign Affairs and Security Policy Federica Mogherini, and the European Commissioner for Enlargement and European Neighbourhood Policy Johannes Hahn, among others.

After the ceremony, Tsipras, along with his Macedonian counterpart, crossed over the border to the Macedonian side of Lake Prespa for lunch at the village of Oteševo. The symbolic move marked the first visit of a Greek prime minister in the Republic of Macedonia since it declared independence in 1991.

== Ratification and implementation ==
On 13 June 2018, Zaev said that North Macedonia is changing the license plates of its vehicles from MK to NMK to reflect the country's new name.

The Macedonian government announced that the statues of Alexander the Great, Philip II of Macedon, and Olympias of Epirus, which were raised as part of the Skopje 2014 program, will be given new inscriptions with clarifications that they symbolize the Ancient Greek period and are "honouring Greek-Macedonian friendship".

=== Ratification by the Macedonian Parliament ===
On 5 July 2018, the Prespa agreement was ratified by the Macedonian parliament with 69 MPs voting in favor of it. However, the Macedonian President Gjorge Ivanov vetoed the bill. Under the Macedonian Constitution, if the Parliament readopts the law with a majority of votes from the total number of MPs, the president is obliged to sign it into law. On 20 June, the Prespa agreement was once again ratified by the Parliament of the Republic of Macedonia with 69 of the total 120 MPs voting in favor of it. Opposition party VMRO-DPMNE boycotted the parliamentary session and declared the Prespa treaty as a "genocide of the legal state" and a "genocide of the entire nation".

On 25 June, the Greek Foreign Ministry informed the EU and NATO that Greece is no longer objecting to Macedonia's Euro-Atlantic accession under the new name. The next day, however, President Ivanov refused to sign the agreement and threatened Macedonian Prime Minister Zaev and the ruling coalition's MPs with imprisonment of at least 5 years for voting in favor of an agreement which, according to Ivanov, puts the Republic of Macedonia in a subordinate position to a foreign state. "I do not accept the constitutional change aimed at changing the constitutional name [of the country]. I do not accept ideas or proposals which would endanger Macedonia's national identity, the individuality of the Macedonian nation, the Macedonian language and the Macedonian model of coexistence. In the presidential election, 534,910 citizens voted in favor of this electoral program. The agreement goes beyond the scope of United Nations Security Council Resolutions 817 (1993) and 845 (1993), since it refers to the "difference in the name of the State" and not to the "disputes" to which the agreement refers", Ivanov said, adding that "This agreement brings the Republic of Macedonia to subordination from another country, namely the Republic of Greece. According to Article 308 of the Penal Code, "a citizen who brings the Republic of Macedonia to a state of subservience or dependence on another state is punishable by imprisonment of at least five years". The legalization of this agreement creates legal consequences that are the basis for committing a crime."

Because the constitution required the president to sign, the ratified agreement was allowed to be officially published in the country's official gazette with a footnote detailing the constitutional and legal situation in place of the president's signature.

The withdrawal of the Greek veto resulted in the European Union approving on 27 June the start of accession talks with the Republic of Macedonia, to begin the next year conditional on the implementation of the Prespa agreement and the change of the nation's constitutional name to Republic of North Macedonia. On 11 July, NATO invited Macedonia to start accession talks in a bid to become the Euro-Atlantic alliance's 30th member.

=== Macedonian referendum and ratification ===
Results of the 2018 Macedonian referendum

On 30 July, the parliament of Macedonia approved plans to hold a non-binding referendum on changing the country's name that took place on 30 September. 91% of voters voted in favour with a 37% turnout, but the referendum was not carried because of a constitutional requirement for a 50% turnout. Total turnout for the referendum was at 666,344 and of those some 260,000 were ethnic Albanian voters of Macedonia. The government intended to push forward with the name change.

On 15 October 2018, the parliament of Macedonia began debating the name change. The proposal for the constitutional reform requires the vote of 80 MPs, i.e. two-thirds of the 120-seat parliament.

On 16 October, US Assistant Secretary of State Wess Mitchell sent a letter to VMRO-DPMNE leader Hristijan Mickoski, in which he expresses the disappointment of the United States with the positions of the leadership, including him personally, and asks to "set aside partisan interests" and work to get the name change approved. Mickoski expressed his hope that the Republic of Macedonia will be very soon a part of the NATO and EU families, "but proud and dignified, not humiliated, disfigured and disgraced."

On 19 October the parliament voted to start the process of renaming the country "North Macedonia", after a total of 80 MPs voted in favour of the constitutional changes.

On 30 October, the Skopje Public Prosecutor's Office opened a case against Macedonian President Gjorge Ivanov for his refusal to fulfill his constitutional obligations in signing the Prespa agreement after it was ratified by the Macedonian Parliament.

On 3 December 2018, Macedonia's Parliament approved a draft constitutional amendment, with 67 lawmakers voting in favour, 23 voting against and 4 abstaining. A simple majority was needed at this stage.

After some political wrangling over constitutional issues related to the multi-ethnic makeup of the state, all Albanian political parties of Macedonia voted in favour of the name change along with the governing Social-Democrats and some members of the opposition. On 11 January 2019, the Macedonian Parliament completed the legal implementation of the Prespa Agreement by approving the constitutional changes for renaming the country to North Macedonia with a two-thirds parliamentary majority (81 MPs).

=== International reactions to Macedonian ratification ===
The international community, NATO and European Union leaders, including Greek PM Alexis Tsipras and Austrian Chancellor Sebastian Kurz, as well as heads of neighboring states, congratulated the Macedonian Prime Minister Zoran Zaev. The British Prime Minister Theresa May described the vote as a "historic moment", while the Kosovar President Hashim Thaçi expressed his hope that the Prespa Agreement, which resolved the Macedonia naming dispute, can be used as a "model" for resolving Kosovo's dispute with Serbia as well. Albanian President Ilir Meta congratulated the name change and Albanian Foreign Minister Ditmir Bushati hailed the vote by tweeting that Albanian political parties were the "decisive factor".

In exile in Hungary, the fugitive former Prime Minister Nikola Gruevski has condemned the Prespa agreement, stating that Zaev "scammed" and "tricked" the Macedonian people over the country's name change, and that the Greek politicians imposed an unfavourable deal upon North Macedonia that outlines exclusive claims over "antique history" by Greece.

=== Post-Macedonian ratification developments ===
On 13 January 2019, Greece Defence Minister Panos Kammenos and his Independent Greeks party quit Greece's ruling coalition over the Prespa agreement, potentially leaving the governing coalition without a workable majority in parliament. Prime Minister Alexis Tsipras then held a confidence vote on 16 January and survived 151–148, with one lawmaker absent. Tsipras survived the vote with 145 of his Radical Left Syriza party and with 6 MPs who were either Independents or Independent Greeks (ANEL). In the days prior to the ratification of the Prespa agreement by the Greek Parliament, over 60,000 protesters (according to police; 600,000, according to organizers) from all over the country arrived in Athens to demand the rejection of the agreement; some of these protests had become violent, with the police required to use tear gas to disperse the groups.

During the last week, public opinion poll showed that over 65% of the people were against the ratification of the Prespa agreement, whereas many popular Greek artists (S. Xarhakos, V. Papakonstantinou J. Kotsiras etc.) agreed that a referendum should have been held. On 19 January, Mikis Theodorakis' editorial was published in which he characterized the ratification of the agreement from Greek MPs as a "crime", demanding a referendum in Greece on the agreement as well.

On 23 January, just a day prior to the ratification in the Hellenic Parliament, hundreds of scholars, professors, writers and artists from all over Greece signed petitions in support of the Prespa agreement.

In a February 2019 survey, a public opinion poll done for Sitel TV channel in North Macedonia showed 44.6% of respondents were positive about the Prespa agreement, while 45.6% were negative toward the accord. A majority, 59.5%, expressed that the agreement would positively impact relations between both countries and 57.7% felt that the two states would implement the accord. Half of respondents, 50.5%, stated that the Macedonian government did well in negotiations with Greece and 40.7% disagreed that it did. Survey participants (49.2%) felt that the agreement would make travel into Greece easier.

=== Ratification by the Greek Parliament ===
On 25 January 2019, Greece's Parliament approved the Prespa agreement with 153 votes in favor and 146 votes against, with 1 abstention. Shortly after the ratification of the deal, Greece's Alternate Foreign Minister Georgios Katrougalos signed, in the Greek Parliament, the enacted law of the Prespa Agreement.

The international community, including the Prime Ministers Theresa May of the United Kingdom, Justin Trudeau of Canada, Boyko Borisov of Bulgaria and Edi Rama of Albania, Presidents Emmanuel Macron of France, Hashim Thaçi of Kosovo, Donald Tusk of the European Union, and Jean-Claude Juncker of the EU's Commission, USA's and Germany's foreign ministers, Michael Pompeo and Heiko Maas respectively, Romania's EU minister George Ciamba whose country held EU presidency, as well as NATO's chief Jens Stoltenberg, welcomed positively the ratification of the deal. (Note: See:) Furthermore, the Republic of Macedonia's Prime Minister Zoran Zaev, in his congratulatory message to his Greek counterpart Alexis Tsipras, whom he called "a friend", described the ratification as a "historic victory" which "ends a long-standing diplomatic conflict between Athens and Skopje". Russia, on the other hand, opposed the Prespa Agreement citing the low turnout in the non-binding 2018 referendum on changing the country's name. Hungary, which gave asylum to fugitive former Macedonian Prime Minister Nikola Gruevski, a staunch critic of the agreement, also lobbied against it.

=== Post-Greek ratification developments ===
On 6 February 2019, NATO's 29 members signed the accession protocol with North Macedonia.

On 8 June 2021, the President of the United States, Joe Biden, signed the Executive Order 14033 for imposing economic sanctions and travel bans to any individuals who may try to undermine the Prespa Agreement.

Alexis Tsipras and Zoran Zaev received jointly a number of awards for their roles as the prime ministers of their respective states in reaching the Prespa Agreement and settling the naming dispute between the two nations, including the Peace Prize of Westphalia, the Ewald von Kleist Award and the Hessian Peace Prize.

== See also ==
- Macedonia naming dispute
