= Tuminec =

Tuminec Bezmisht Kallamas Туминец
- Village
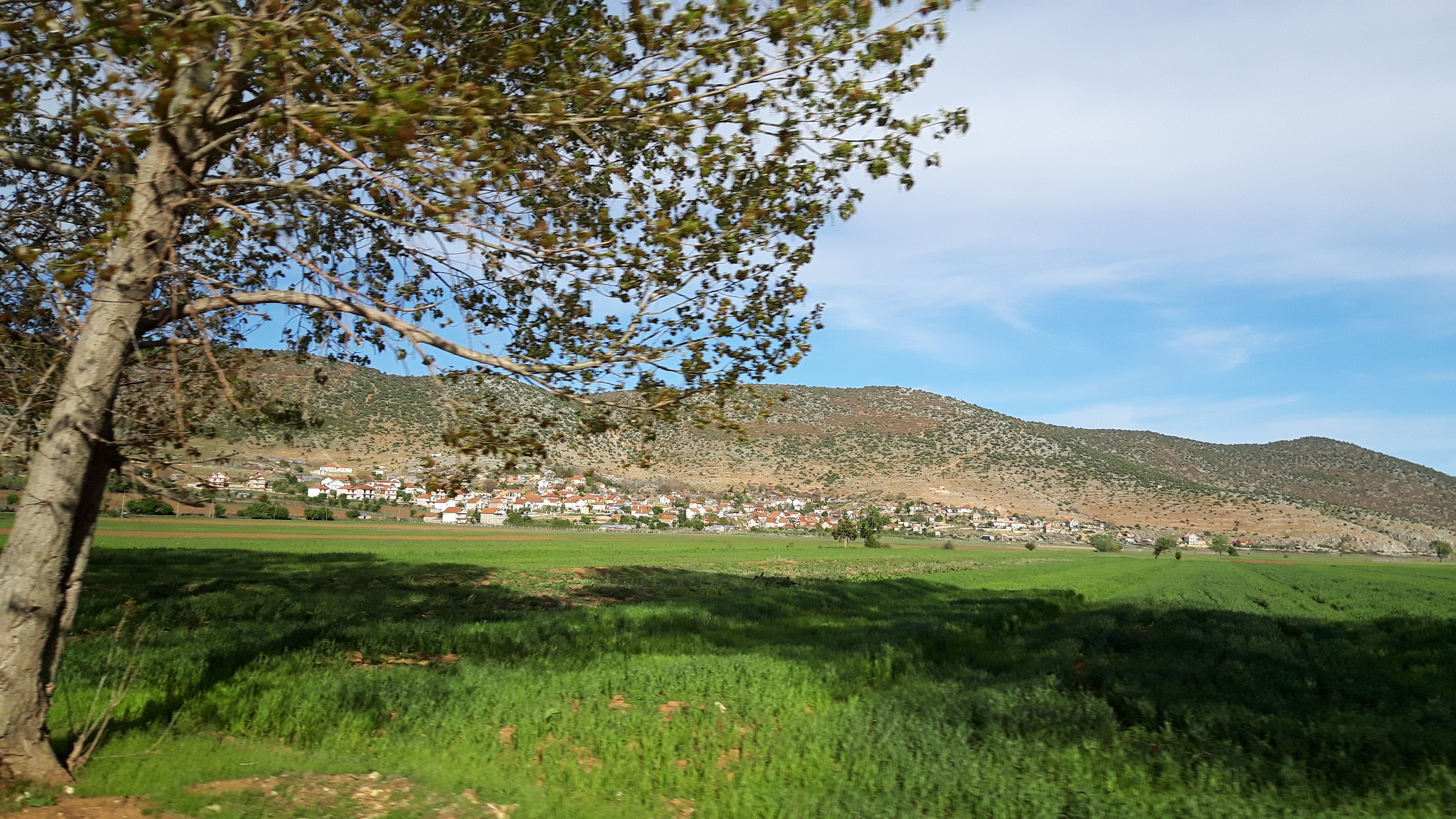

- Location within Albania
- Coordinates: 40°53′58″N 20°56′21″E
- Country: Albania
- County: Korçë
- Municipality: Pustec
- Administrative unit: Pustec

Population (2000)
  - Total: 658
- Time zone: UTC+1 (CET)
  - Summer (DST): UTC+2 (CEST)

Tuminec (Albanian: Tuminec, formally Bezmisht and Kallamas; Macedonian/language|: Туминец) is a village just north of the Albanian portion of Lake Prespa in the Pustec Municipality of the Korçë County. The villages of Konjsko and Stenje are opposite the Albania-Macedonia border from Tuminec.

== History ==
According to archaeological evidence found in 2011, the Tuminec area was inhabited during Neolithic times.

The nearby Church of the Holy Mother of God, a rock church, was built in the 14th century. The village was mentioned in the Slepche Beadroll from the end of XVI century.

In 1900, Vasil Kanchov gathered and compiled statistics on demographics in the area and reported that the village of Tumanets (Туманецъ) was inhabited by about 360 Bulgarian Christians. Following the Ilinden Uprising of 1903, Tuminec came under the Bulgarian Exarchate. According to a Bulgarian survey two years later, the village's population consisted of 520 Christian Bulgarians.

Until 1970, the official Albanian name for the village was Bezmisht; it then became Kallamas. In 2013, the official name was changed back to Tuminec.

== Demographics ==
According to Yugoslav sources from 1981, the village was populated exclusively by Macedonians.

A 2007 Bulgarian estimate made by a researcher from Albania put the village population around 950 to 1,000 residents and describes the inhabitants of the whole region of Mala Prespa as Macedonians.

== Culture ==
Tuminec is the nearest village to the Orthodox Church of the Holy Mother of God, situated on a rocky ridge about 10 meters from the Macedonian border. Some of the older paintings in the church date from the 18th century. It is also home to the Church of St Demetrius.

Tuminec has a football club, FK Tuminec, that competes with other villages in the Prespa area of Pustec.
