= St. Mary's Church, Maligrad =

14th-century church in Albania

St. Mary’s Cave Church
- Albanian: Shpella e Maligradit
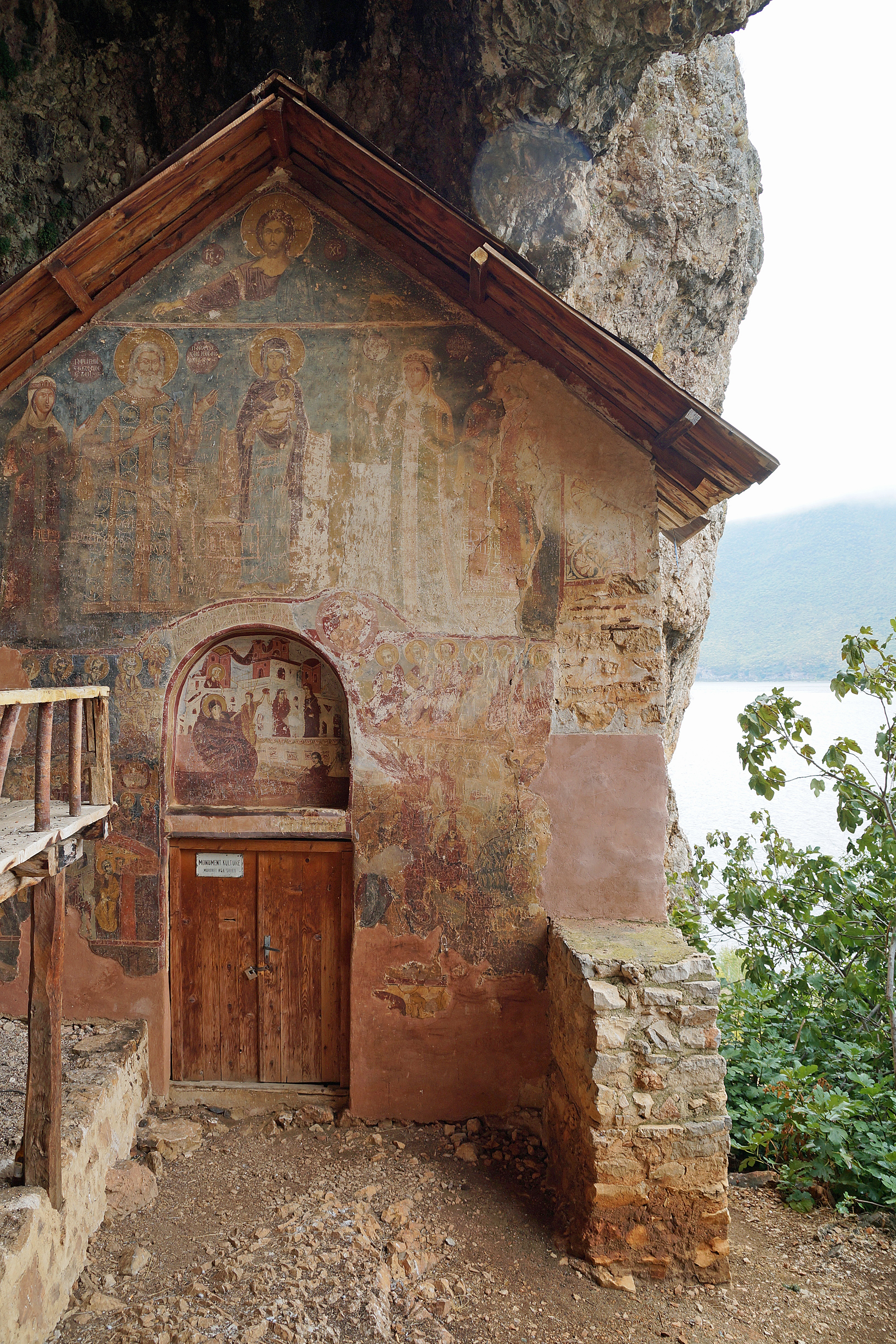

Religion
- Affiliation: Eastern Orthodox Christianity

Location
- Location: Maligrad, lake Prespa
- Country: Albania
- Interactive map of St. Mary’s Cave Church
- Coordinates: 40.7920°N 20.9317°E

Architecture
- Style: Serbian Orthodox Art
- Founder: Kesar Novak
- Completed: 1369

The St. Mary's Church or Virgin Mary's Church (Albanian: Shpella e Maligradit, Macedonian: Рождество на Пресвета Богородица) is an Eastern Orthodox cave church on the island of Maligrad, in the Albanian part of Lake Prespa. It is a Cultural Monument of Albania. The church is dedicated to Saint Mary and was built by Serbian nobleman Kesar Novak, in the year 1369.

The church has frescoes and Greek inscriptions dated to 1369. Frescoes exist of the family of Kesar Novak, with his Greek wife Kalia.
