= Kesar Novak =

Serbian nobleman

Kesar Novak the Serb
- caesar of Lake Prespa
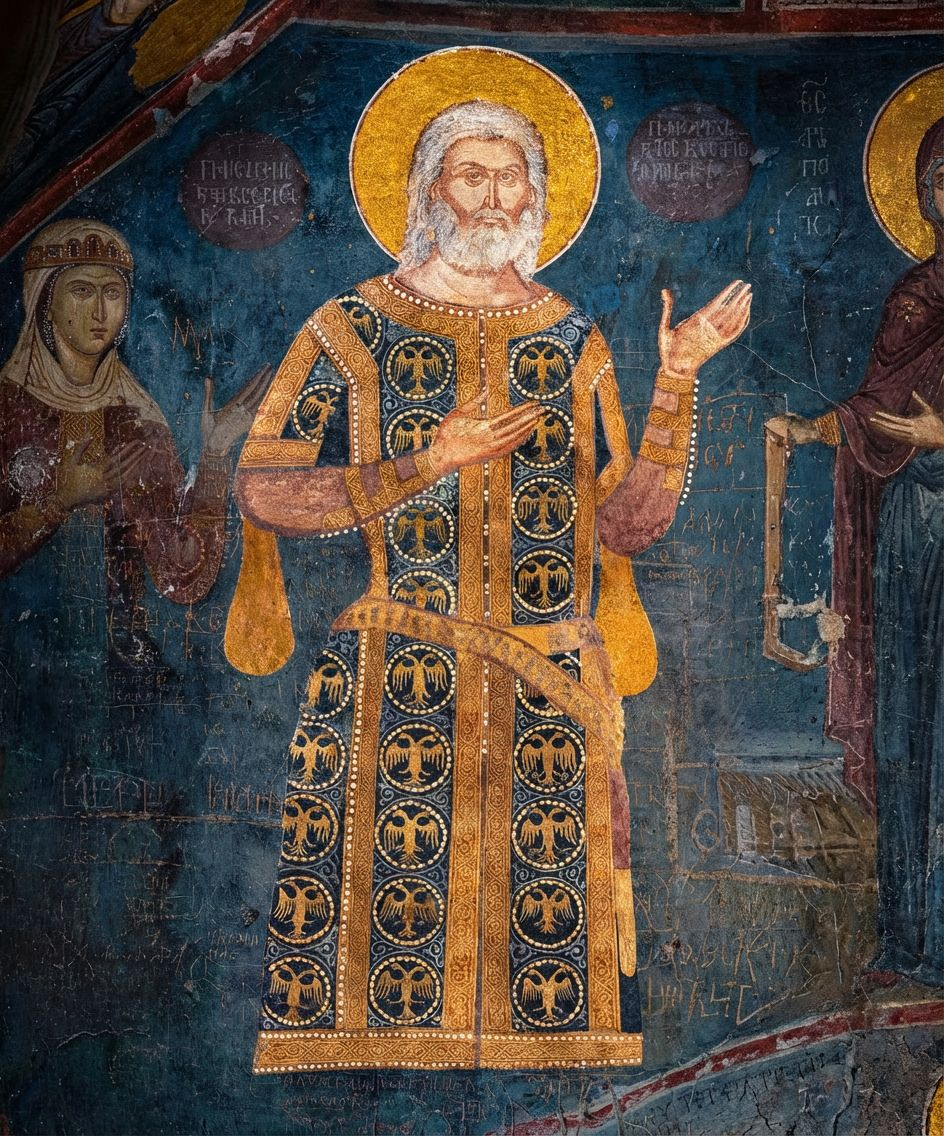
- Fresco depicting him found in Saint Mary's Church.
- Wife: Kali
- Issue: Amiral; Marija

Kesar Novak (Serbian Cyrillic: Кесар Новак) was a 14th-century Serbian nobleman that held the region of Lake Prespa during the Serbian Empire of Uroš the Weak (r. 1355–1371).

== Biography ==
Novak held the title of Caesar, and is hence also known as Kesar Novak. He had a Greek wife, Kali, with whom he had a daughter Marija (Maria) and a son Amiral (Amiralis).

Among his endowments are the cave-church of Bogorodica (Holy Virgin Eleusa) on the island of Maligrad where frescoes and Greek inscriptions of his family exist dating to 1369.

== Sources ==
- Stari srpski spomenici u Južnoj Srbiji, Dr Vlad. R. Petković, 1924
- The Serbs and Byzantium during the reign of Tsar Stephen Dušan (1331-1355) and his successors, by George Christos Soulis, page 214-5
- Гоце Ангеличин - Жура
- Ivan M. Đorđević, Zidno slikarstvo srpske vlastele u doba Nemanjića (Wall-Paintings of the Serbian Nobility of the Nemanide Era) OCLC 34957313, sl. 84 i 85
- Tania Velmans, La Peinture murale byzantine à la fin du Moyen âge, Volume 1

New title	Caesar of Prespa under Vukašin Mrnjavčević fl. 1369	Succeeded by ?
