= List of islands of North Macedonia =

This is a list of islands of the Republic of North Macedonia. Since the country is landlocked, all its islands are situated in lakes or rivers. The largest island in North Macedonia is Golem Grad in Prespa Lake with an area of 0.18 km^{2} (0.07 sq mi), and also the only one found in a natural lake (the rest are themselves natural, but situated in artificial lakes).

== Lake islands ==
=== Debar Lake ===
- Greater Debar Island and Lesser Debar Island (41°27′43.73″N 20°31′58.49″E)

=== Kalimanci Lake ===
- Kalata (peninsula in summer) (41°59′6.03″N 22°35′25.85″E)

=== Prespa Lake ===
- Golem Grad (Snake Island) (40°52′N 20°59′E)

=== Tikveš Lake ===
- Gradište (41°23′12.82″N 21°57′6.57″E)
- unnamed island in around off the coast at Brušani (Kavadarci Municipality) (41°23′52.29″N 21°57′6.67″E)
- unnamed island in around off the coast of Dradnja (Kavadarci Municipality) (41°23′37.8″N 21°56′34.2″E)
- unnamed island near the place when the lake branches off and continues into Blaštica River.(41°16′4.78″N 21°56′57.39″E)

== River islands ==
River islands are found mainly in course of the Vardar that stretches from the central to the southern part of the country. Of special note are those found in Valandovo Municipality. (41°11′46″N 22°32′14″E).

- Janitaš, Veles
- Adata
