= St Mary's Church, Tuminec =

Cultural monument of Albania

Coordinates: 40.8869°N 20.9731°E

St. Mary's Cave
- Shpella e Shën Mërisë (Albanian)
- Interactive map of St. Mary's Cave
- Location: Tuminec

Cultural Monument of Albania

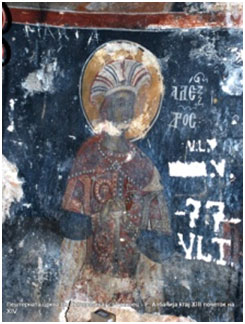
Fresco of Saint Alexander in Saint Mary Church in Tuminets.

St Mary's Church (Albanian: Shpella e Shën Mërisë; Macedonian: Света Богодордица) is a cave church in Tuminec, Korçë County, Albania. It is a Cultural Monument of Albania.
