= St. Demetrius' Church, Tuminec =

Cultural monument of Albania

Coordinates: 40.8975°N 20.9414°E

St. Demetrius' Church
- Kisha e Shën Mitrit (Albanian)
- Interactive map of St. Demetrius' Church
- Location: Tuminec

Cultural Monument of Albania

St. Demetrius' Church (Albanian: Kisha e Shën Mitrit) is a church in Tuminec, Korçë County, Albania. It is a Cultural Monument of Albania.
