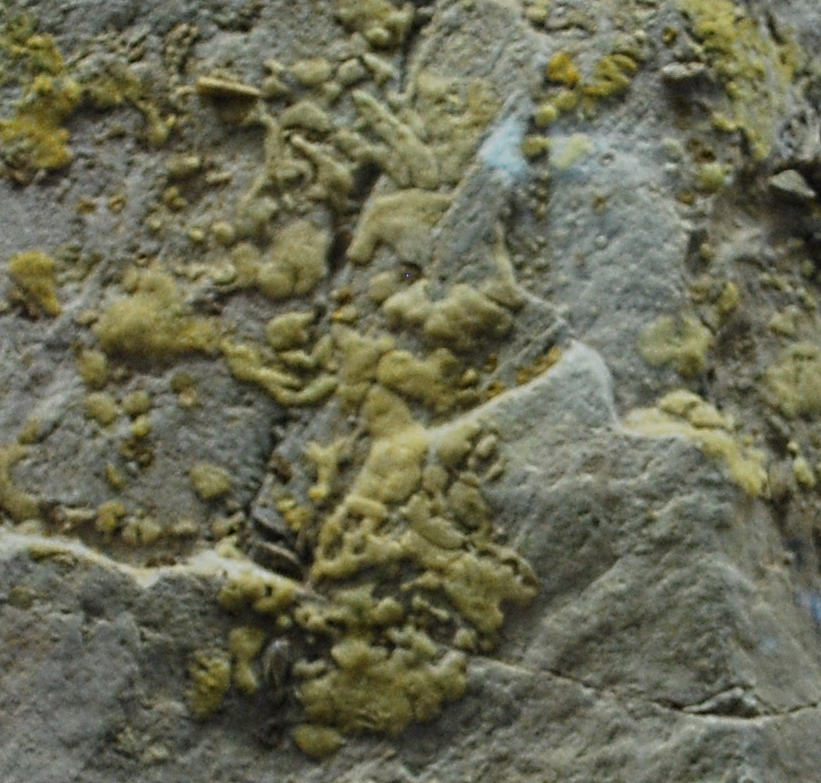

Scientific classification
- Kingdom: Animalia
- Phylum: Porifera
- Class: Demospongiae
- Order: Spongillida
- Family: Spongillidae
- Genus: Spongilla
- Species: S. prespensis

Binomial name
- Spongilla prespensis (Hadzische, 1953)

= Spongilla prespensis =

Species of sponge

Spongilla prespensis is freshwater sponge endemic to Lake Prespa. The sponge lives in rocky places in the lake.
