= Golem Grad =

Island in Lake Prespa in North Macedonia

Native name: Голем Град
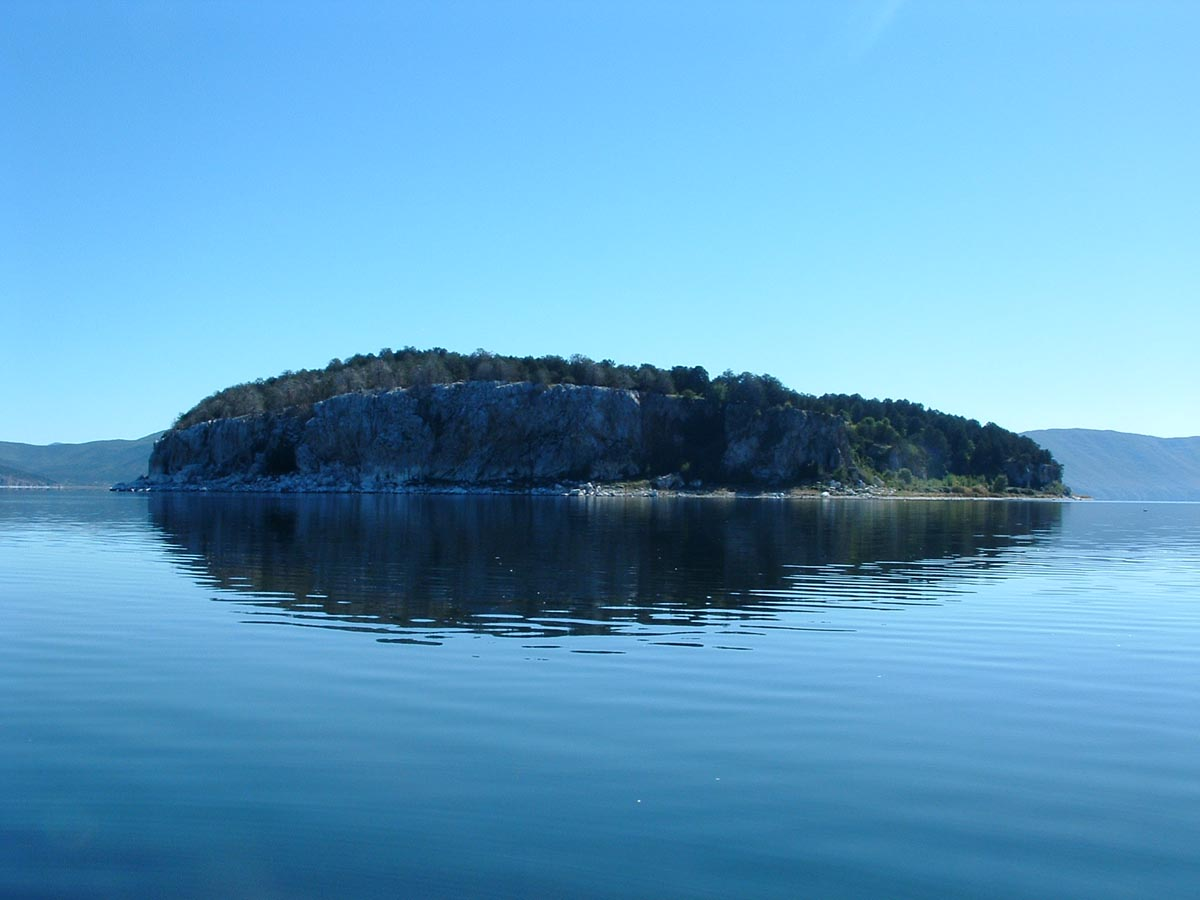
- Golem Grad from Lake Prespa

- Map of Golem Grad with its ruins and archaeological sites

- Location in North Macedonia

Geography
- Location: Lake Prespa
- Coordinates: 40°52′N 20°59′E
- Area: 0.2 km^{2} (0.077 sq mi)
- Highest elevation: 50 m (160 ft)

Administration
- North Macedonia
- Municipality: Resen

Demographics
- Population: 0

Golem Grad (Macedonian: Голем Град), meaning Big City/Town, also known as Snake Island or Pelican Island, is an island in North Macedonia. The island covers an area of more than 20 hectares. It is located in Lake Prespa, a few kilometers from the Greek and Albanian border. Golem Grad is home to several ancient ruins and churches. It is also home to several different communities of animals, especially snakes. In August 2008, the island opened to tourists.

== Description ==
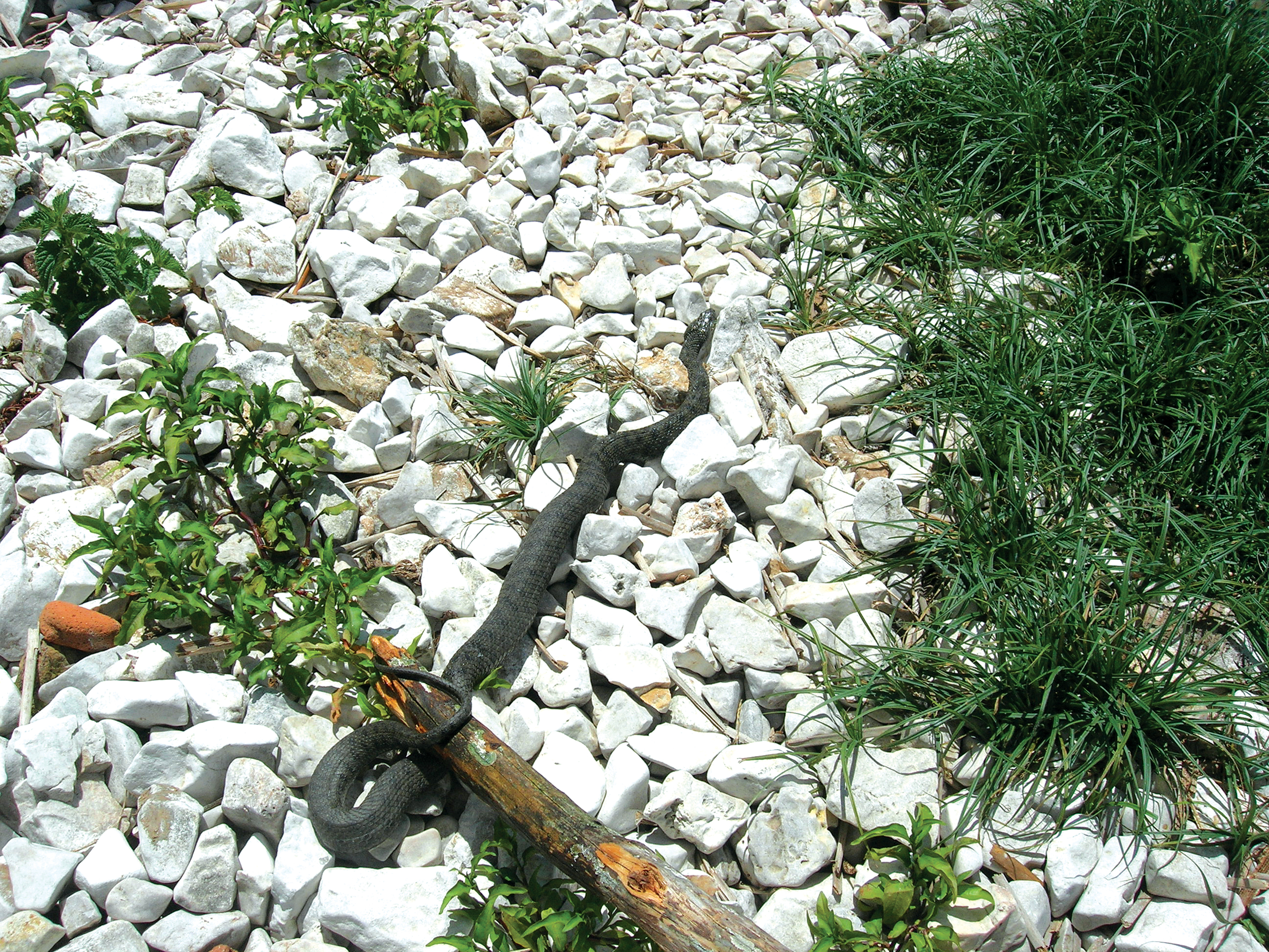
Snake on the island

Golem Grad has an area of 20 hectares and is 600 meters long and 350 meters wide. The island is currently uninhabited and has been so since the mid-20th century, when the small monastic community left the island. The island can only be reached by boat. The village of Konjsko is closest to the island with about two kilometers of water between the two.

== Tortoises ==
Golem Grad is home to around 1,000 Hermann's tortoises, which were introduced by humans to the island. Due to genetic variation or an initial imbalance in sex when they were first introduced, the tortoises present an extreme sex imbalance of 19 males for each female. As a result the males compete aggressively for the few females, often forming piles on top of them during the mating season. This sexual aggression triggers the flee instinct on the females, which drives them on the brink of cliffs where they sustain severe injuries or die.

== See also ==
- Lake Prespa
- List of islands of North Macedonia
- Maligrad
