= Maligrad =

Island in Albania

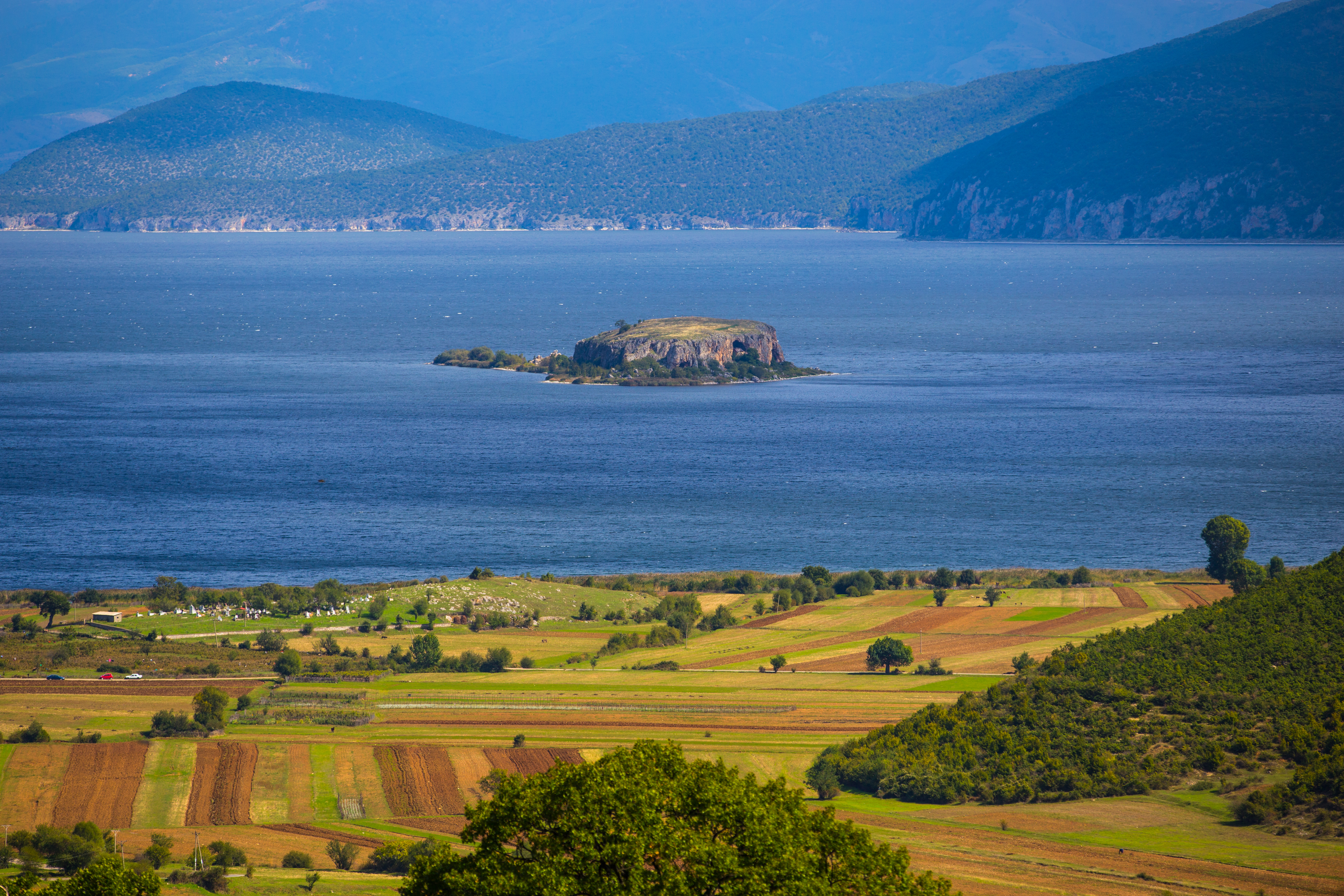
- Maligrad Island on Lake Prespa

- Location within Albania
- Etymology: Island of Snakes

Geography
- Location: Lake Prespa
- Coordinates: 40°47′28″N 20°56′32″E
- Area: 0.05 km^{2} (0.019 sq mi)
- Area rank: 7th
- Highest elevation: 860 m (2820 ft)

Administration
- Albania
- County: Korçë County
- Municipality: Pustec

Maligrad (Albanian: Maligrad, also Qytet i Vogël "small city"; Macedonian: Мал Град, Mal Grad "small city/town") is an island situated deep within the Albanian part of Lake Prespa, with many caves suitable for wildlife and a circular cliff. Shaped like a tadpole, it contains some trees and an area of sand. The island contains a famous Saint Mary Church, built by Kesar Novak (Qesar Novaku), a local noble, in 1369. It has an area of almost 5 hectares.

== See also ==
- St. Mary's Church, Maligrad
- Golem Grad
