= Konjsko, Resen =

Konjsko Коњско
- Village
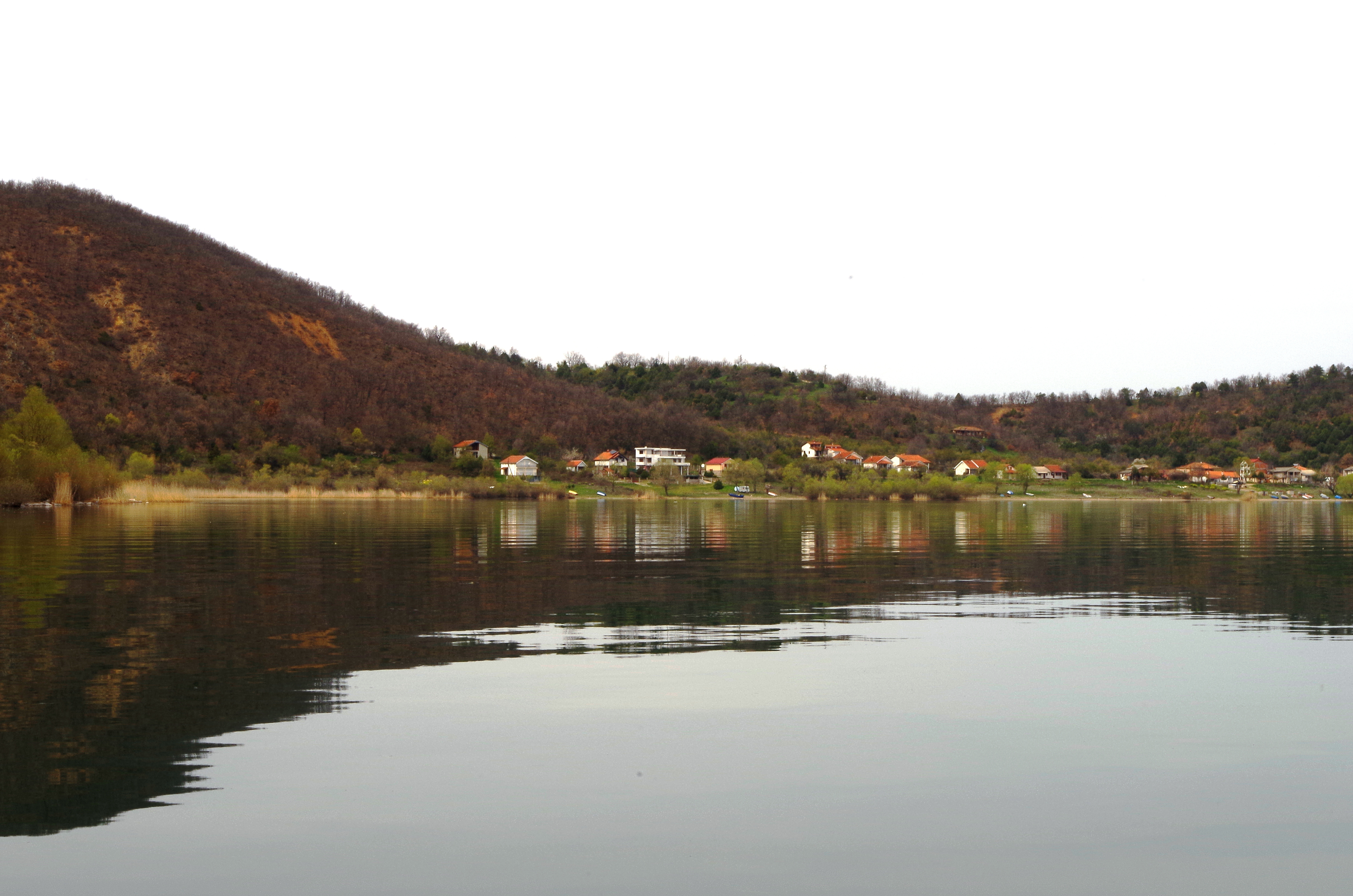
- View of Konjsko

- Location within North Macedonia
- Coordinates: 40°54′40″N 20°59′14″E
- Country: North Macedonia
- Region: Pelagonia
- Municipality: Resen

Population (2021)
  - Total: 13
- Time zone: UTC+1 (CET)
  - Summer (DST): UTC+2 (CEST)
- Area code: +389
- Car plates: RE

Konjsko (Macedonian: Коњско) is a village in the Resen Municipality of North Macedonia. Located on the western shore of Lake Prespa, Konjsko is just east of the Albania–North Macedonia border, with the village of Tuminec being the nearest settlement on the opposite side of the border. Konjsko is also the nearest settlement to the island of Golem Grad.

== Demographics ==
As of the 2021 census, Konjsko had 13 residents with the following ethnic composition:

- Macedonians 11
- Persons for whom data are taken from administrative sources 2

In the 2002 census, Konjsko had three permanent residents.

Ethnic group	census 1961		census 1971		census 1981		census 1991		census 1994		census 2002		census 2021	
Ethnic group	Number	%	Number	%	Number	%	Number	%	Number	%	Number	%	Number	%
Macedonians	84	100	46	100	36	100	13	100	4	100	3	100	11	84.6
Persons for whom data are taken from administrative sources													2	15.4
Total	84		46		36		13		4		3		13	
