= Stenje =

Stenje Стење
- Village
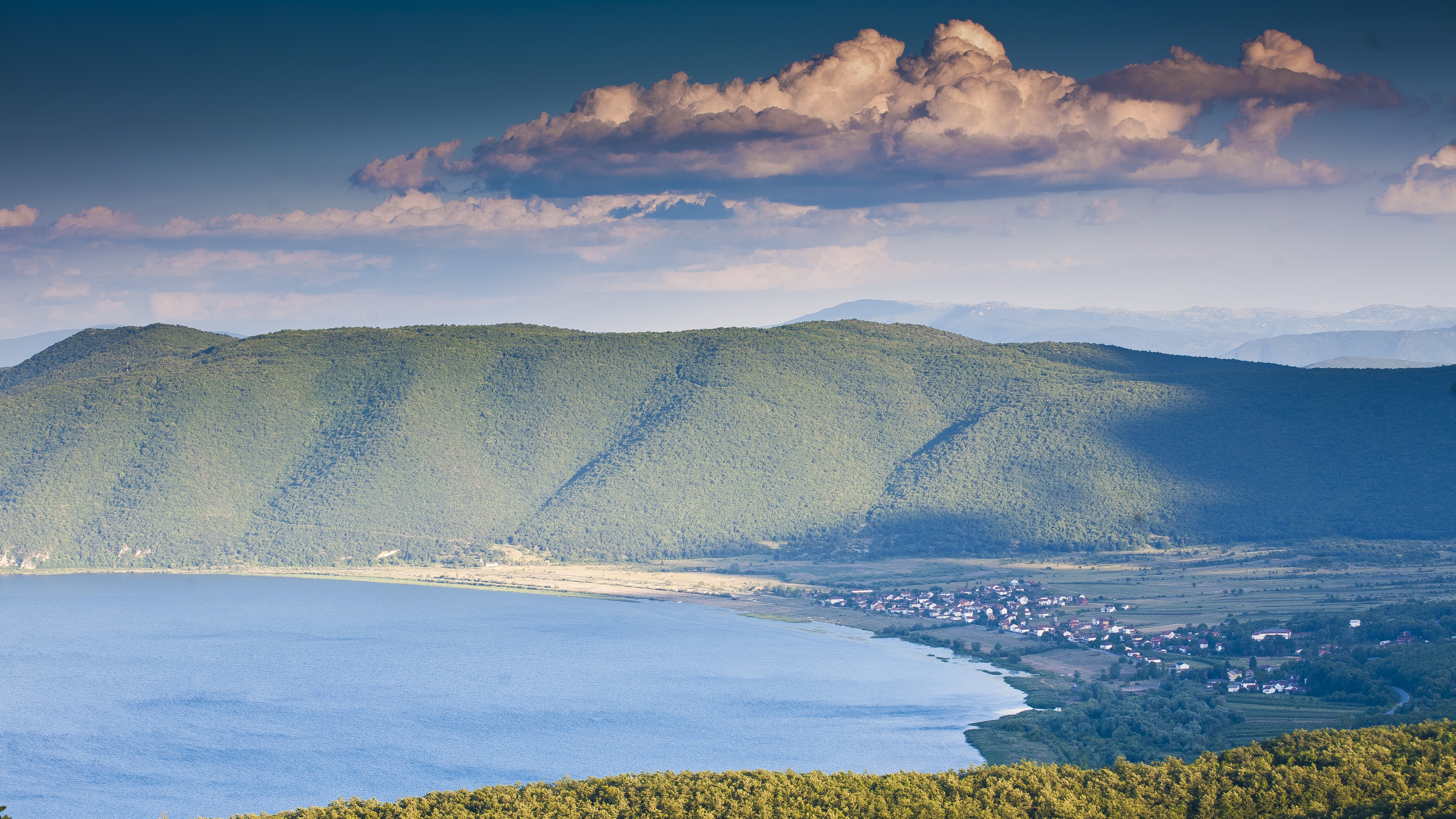
- Stenje as seen from Galičica

- Location within North Macedonia
- Coordinates: 40°56′1″N 20°55′0″E
- Country: North Macedonia
- Region: Pelagonia
- Municipality: Resen

Population (2002)
  - Total: 438
- Time zone: UTC+1 (CET)
  - Summer (DST): UTC+2 (CEST)
- Area code: +389
- Car plates: RE

Stenje (Macedonian: Стење) is a village in the Resen Municipality of North Macedonia. It is located on the shore of Lake Prespa, near the Macedonian-Albanian border and Galičica National Park. Today, the village has 438 inhabitants.

== Demographics ==
As of the census in 2002, Stenje has an ethnically homogeneous population of Macedonians. The village is also one of only four in the municipality to have gained population from the 1994 census to the 2002 one.

Ethnic group	census 1961		census 1971		census 1981		census 1991		census 1994		census 2002	
Ethnic group	Number	%	Number	%	Number	%	Number	%	Number	%	Number	%
Macedonians	466	97.7	440	96.9	425	97.7	333	99.1	320	98.8	438	100.0
Serbs	9	1.9	7	1.5	4	0.9	1	0.3	2	0.6	0	0.0
others	2	0.4	7	1.5	6	1.4	2	0.6	2	0.6	0	0.0
Total	477		454		435		336		324		438	

All but one of the villagers declared Macedonian to be their mother tongue.

=== Religion ===
All of Stenje's residents identified as Macedonian Orthodox in the previous census. The village has four churches including the Church of St Atanas, the Church of Ss Cyril and Methodius, the Church of St Nicholas, and the Church of the Presentation of the Holy Mother of God.

== People from Stenje ==
- Stojan Georgiev (? - 1922), revolutionary and member of the Internal Macedonian Revolutionary Organization
