= Oteševo =

Oteševo Отешево
- Village
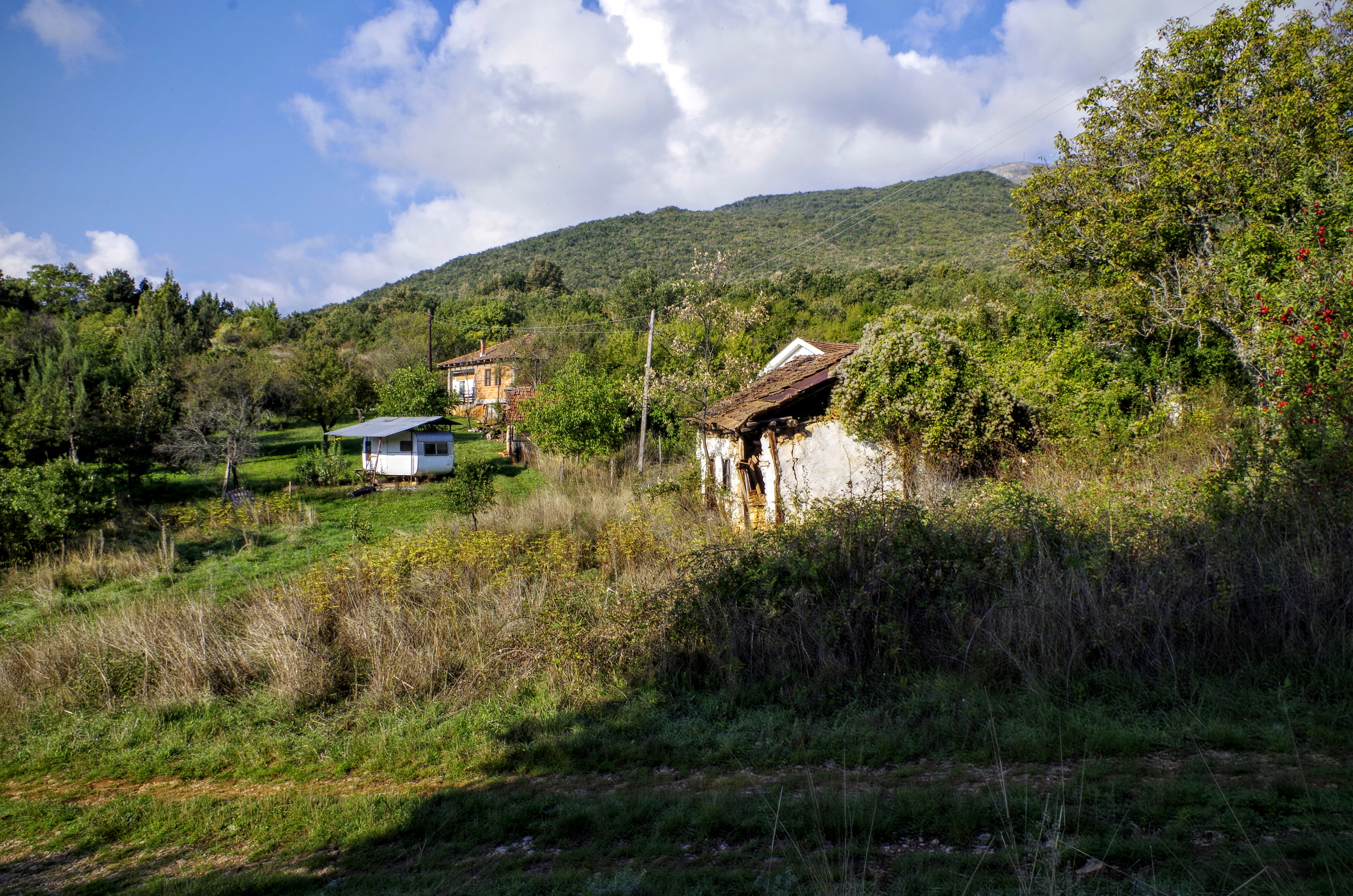
- View of the abandoned village Oteševo

- Location within North Macedonia
- Coordinates: 40°58′46″N 20°55′00″E
- Country: North Macedonia
- Region: Pelagonia
- Municipality: Resen

Population (2002)
  - Total: 0
- Time zone: UTC+1 (CET)
  - Summer (DST): UTC+2 (CEST)
- Area code: +389
- Car plates: RE

Oteševo (Macedonian: Отешево) is a village in the Resen Municipality of North Macedonia. Oteševo, located on the shore of Lake Prespa, is roughly 14 kilometres (8.7 mi) from the municipal centre of Resen. The village is without permanent residents.

There are some lakeside resorts nearby.

== Demographics ==
The last census in which Oteševo still had permanent residents was in 1981.

Ethnic group	census 1961		census 1971		census 1981		census 1991		census 1994		census 2002		census 2021	
Ethnic group	Number	%	Number	%	Number	%	Number	%	Number	%	Number	%	Number	%
Macedonians	62	98.4	52	100.0	14	100.0	0	-	0	-	0	-	0	-
others	1	1.6	0	0.0	0	0.0	0	-	0	-	0	-	0	-
Total	63		52		14		0		0		0		0	
