= Psarades =

Psarades Ψαράδες
- Community
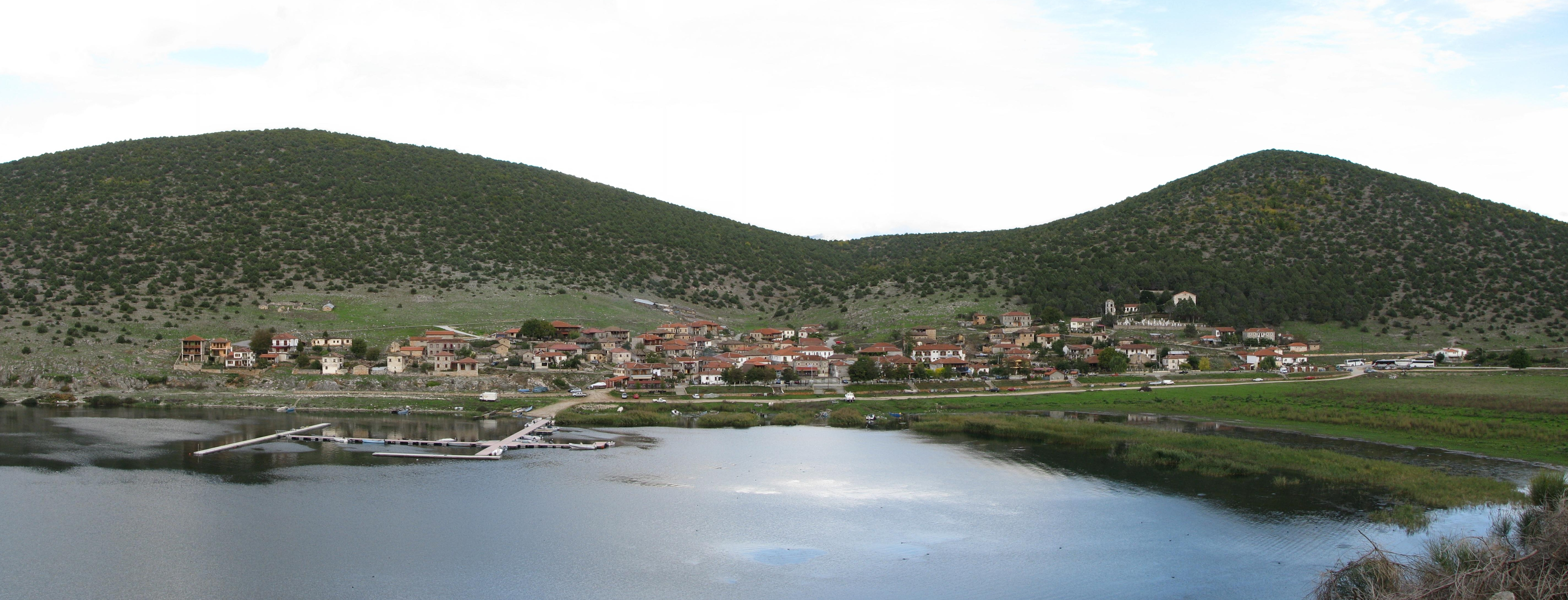
- Panorama of Psarades.

- Location within Greece
- Coordinates: 40°49.8′N 21°1.9′E
- Country: Greece
- Administrative region: West Macedonia
- Regional unit: Florina
- Municipality: Prespes
- Municipal unit: Prespes

Area
  - Community: 41.064 km^{2} (15.855 sq mi)
- Elevation: 850 m (2,790 ft)

Population (2021)
  - Community: 73
  - Density: 1.8/km^{2} (4.6/sq mi)
- Time zone: UTC+2 (EET)
  - Summer (DST): UTC+3 (EEST)
- Postal code: 530 77
- Area code: +30-2385
- Vehicle registration: PA

On the origin of the name Nivici
Excerpt from a man from Nivici, Mala Prespa (today Psarades) speaking in the local Lower Prespa dialect of Macedonian

Psarades (Greek: Ψαράδες) is a village and a community of the Prespes municipality, northern Greece. Before the 2011 local government reform it was part of the municipality of Prespes, of which it was a municipal district.

== Name ==
The current name of the village, Psarades, means "fishermen" in Greek. Until 1927, Psarades was known as Nivitsa (Greek: Νίβιτσα). In Macedonian and in Bulgarian it is known as Нивици; Nivici/Nivitsi, meaning fields.

== History ==
At the end of the 19th century, Nivitsi was a predominantly Bulgarian village. In the Ethnography of the Adrianople, Monastir and Salonica villas, published in Constantinople in 1878 and reflecting the statistics of the 1873 male population, Nivitzi is referred to as a village in the kaza of Resen with 30 households and 92 Bulgarians.

Another report, at the beginning of the 20th century, also stated that Nivitsi was a predominantly Bulgarian village. According to the statistics of Vasil Kanchov ("Macedonia, Ethnography and Statistics"), 200 Bulgarian Christians lived in the village in 1900.

After the Ilinden Uprising in 1904, the whole village passed under the jurisdiction of the Bulgarian Exarchate. According to the Exarchist secretary Dimitar Mishev (1906), there were 528 Bulgarian Exarchists in Nivitsi. The Bulgarian church "Virgin Mary" was built here in 1893.

=== Prespa agreement ===
On 17 June 2018, the Prime Ministers of Greece and the Republic of Macedonia signed an agreement at the village, aiming the end of the Macedonia naming dispute. The Prespa Agreement took its name from homonymous lake, on the shores of which the village of Psarades was built.

== Demographics ==
Psarades had 172 inhabitants in 1981. In fieldwork done by anthropologist Riki Van Boeschoten in late 1993, Psarades was populated by Slavophones. The Macedonian language was spoken in the village by people over 30 in public and private settings. Children understood the language, but mostly did not use it.

The 2021 census recorded 73 inhabitants in the village. The community of Psarades covers an area of 41.064 km^{2} (15 3/4 sq. mi.).

== See also ==
- List of settlements in the Florina regional unit
