= Lake Prespa =

Lake in South-eastern Europe

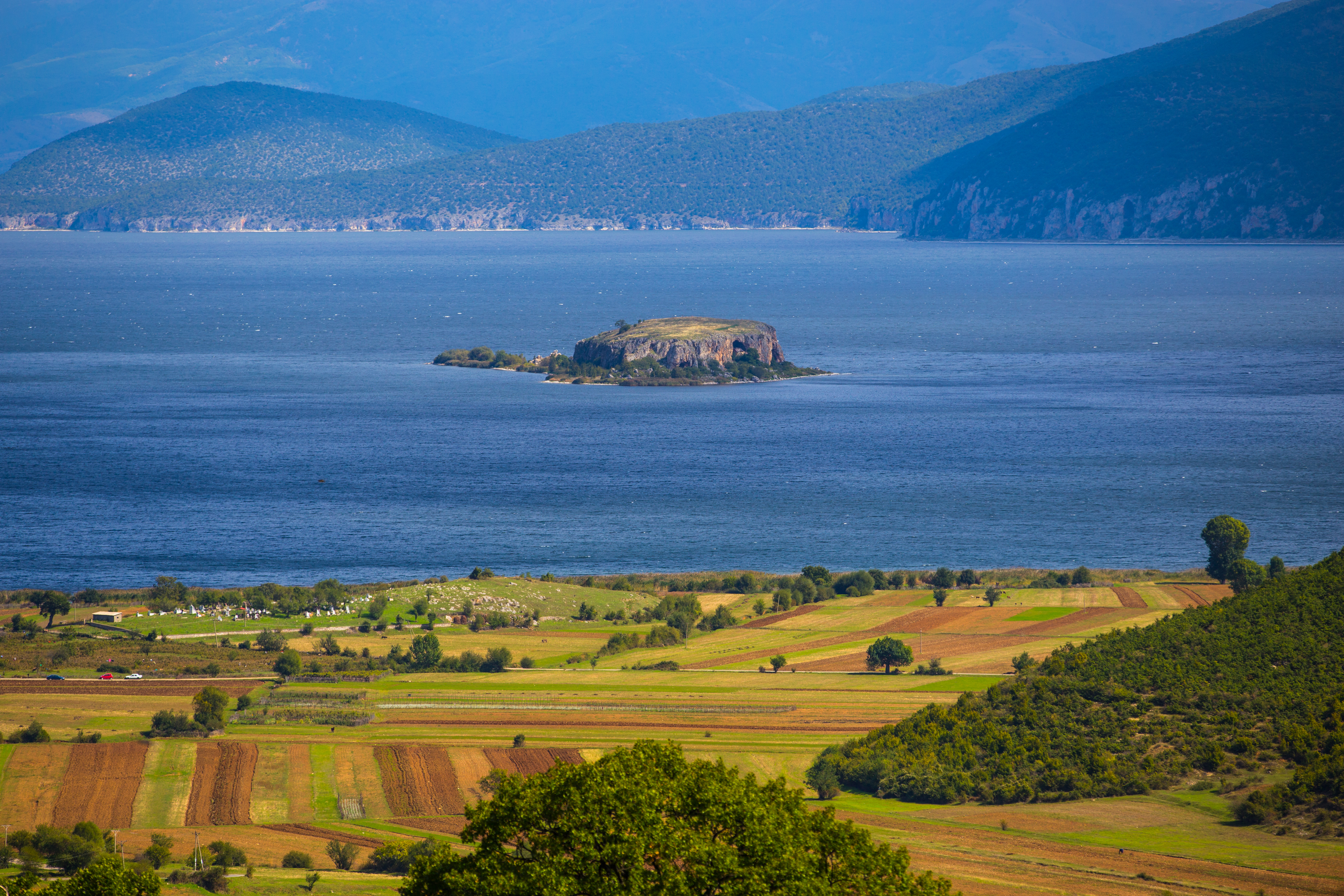
- The Island of Maligrad in the Albanian part of the lake

- Location within North Macedonia Location within Albania Location within Greece Location within Balkans Location within Europe
- Location: Balkan Peninsula
- Coordinates: 40°54′N 21°02′E
- Type: Ancient lake, tectonic
- Primary outflows: Lake Ohrid via karstic channels
- Basin countries: North Macedonia; Albania; Greece
- Surface area: 318 km^{2} (123 sq mi)
- Max. depth: 54 m (177 ft)
- Surface elevation: 853 m (2,799 ft)
- Islands: Golem Grad, Mal Grad

Ramsar Wetland
- Official name: Lake Prespa
- Designated: 4 April 1995
- Reference no.: 726

Ramsar Wetland
- Official name: Albanian Prespa Lakes
- Designated: 13 June 2013
- Reference no.: 2151

The Lake Prespa is located on the tripoint of North Macedonia, Albania and Greece. It is a system of two lakes separated by an isthmus: the Great Prespa Lake, divided among the three countries, and the Little Prespa Lake, mostly within Greece. They are the highest tectonic lakes in the Balkans, at an elevation of 853 metres (2,799 ft).

The area contains three national parks: Galičica National Park in North Macedonia, Prespa National Park in Albania, and Prespa National Park in Greece. The largest town in the region is Resen in North Macedonia. In 2014, Ohrid-Prespa Transboundary Biosphere Reserve between Albania and North Macedonia was added to UNESCO's World Network of Biosphere Reserves.

== Geography ==
The Great Prespa Lake (Macedonian: Преспанско Езеро, Prespansko Ezero, Albanian: Liqeni i Prespës së Madhe, Greek: Μεγάλη Πρέσπα, Megáli Préspa) has the total surface of 259 km^{2} (100.00 sq mi). The largest part of it, 176.3 km^{2} (68.07 sq mi) belongs to North Macedonia; 46.3 km^{2} (17.88 sq mi) to Albania; and 36.4 km^{2} (14.05 sq mi) to Greece.

To the south, the Little Prespa Lake (Greek: Μικρή Πρέσπα, Mikri Prespa; Albanian: Prespa e Vogël; Macedonian: Мало Преспанско Езеро) has the total surface area of 46.8 km^{2} (18.07 sq mi), most of it in Greece, with the westernmost tip (4.3 km^{2} (1.66 sq mi)) in Albania.

The two lakes are separated by a 4-kilometre-long (2.5 mi) and 500-metre-wide (550 yd) isthmus on the Greek territory, carrying an embankment with a road connecting the village of Psarades. A short stretch of a canal connects the lakes on the western side of the isthmus.

== History ==
Topographic map of Lake Prespa and Lake Ohrid.

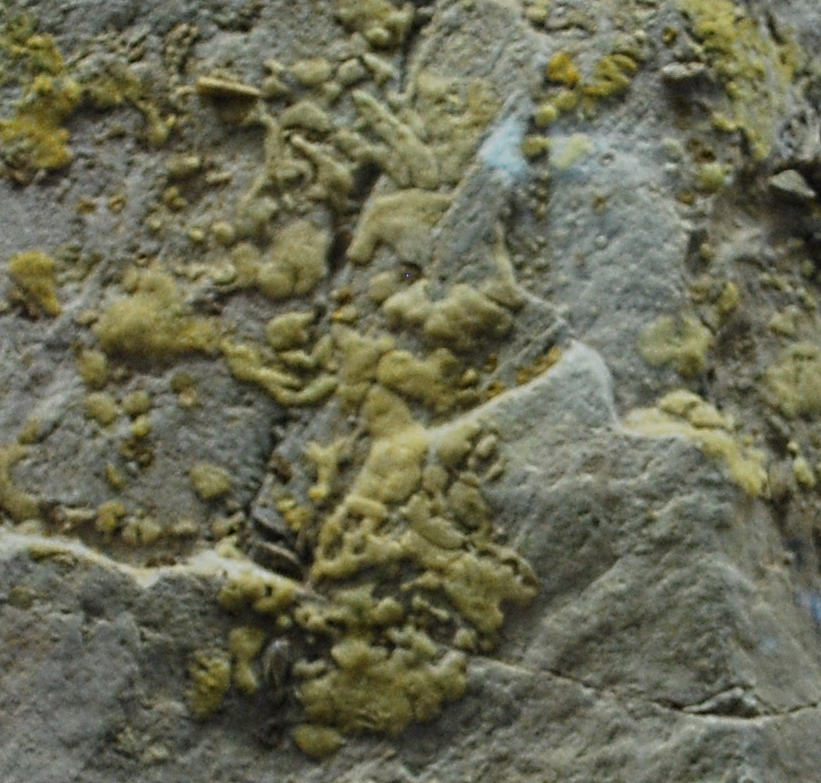
Spongilla prespensis is endemic to Lake Prespa

In Classical times, the Prespa region formed part of ancient Lynkestis, and the lakes were called Little and Great Brygeis. In the 10th century, the Tsar Samuel built the fortress and church of St. Achillius on an island called Agios Achillios in the Small Prespa Lake, on the Greek side of the border. The biggest island in the Great Prespa Lake, within North Macedonia, is called Golem Grad ("Large Town"), and Snake Island (Zmiski Ostrov). The other island Mal Grad ("Small Town", in Albania) is the site of a ruined 14th century monastery dedicated to St. Peter. Today, both islands are uninhabited.

Because Great Prespa Lake sits in limestone country about 150m above Lake Ohrid, which lies only about 10 km (6 miles) to the west, the only outlets for its waters are through underground channels in the karst and emerge from springs which feed streams running into Lake Ohrid.

In the 1970s, the communist regime in Albania diverted the Devoll River feeding the Little Prespa to irrigate agricultural lands in the Korçë area, contributing to the depletion of the lake's surface area from 450 hectares to no more than 20 hectares by 2024, with the lost area either drying out or converted into swampland. The Great Prespa also saw its surface area decrease by seven percent and its volume reduced by half from 1984 to 2020.

For many years, the Greek part of the Prespa Lakes region was an underpopulated, militarily sensitive area which required special permission for outsiders to visit. It saw fierce fighting during the Greek Civil War and much of the local population subsequently emigrated to escape endemic poverty and political strife. The region developed little until the 1970s, when it began to be promoted as a tourist destination. With its abundance of rare fauna and flora, the area was declared a Transnational Park in 2000. In 1999 the Society for the Protection of Prespa received the Ramsar Wetland Conservation Award for its conservation efforts regarding the Lake Prespa Ramsar site, and was eventually included on 3 July 2013.

In 2018, Great Prespa Lake was the setting for the signing of the Prespa Agreement, intended to resolve the Macedonia naming dispute by renaming the Republic of Macedonia to North Macedonia. The agreement was signed on 17 June 2018 in a high-level ceremony at the Greek border village of Psarades on the lake, by the two foreign ministers Nikola Dimitrov (of the Republic of Macedonia) and Nikos Kotzias (of Greece) and in the presence of the respective prime ministers, Zoran Zaev and Alexis Tsipras. After the ceremony, Tsipras and Zaev crossed over the border to North Macedonia's side of the lake for lunch at the village of Oteševo, in a highly symbolic move that marked the first time a Greek prime minister set foot in the Republic of Macedonia since it declared independence in 1991.

== Wildlife ==
Only 11 native fish species are known from the lake. Of these 9 of these are endemic: Alburnoides prespensis, Alburnus belvica, Barbus prespensis, Chondrostoma prespense, Cobitis meridionalis, Pelasgus prespensis, Rutilus prespensis, Salmo peristericus and Squalius prespensis; the additional two are Anguilla anguilla (European eel) and Cyprinus carpio (European carp). The lake is also home to the freshwater sponge Spongilla prespensis.

=== Important Bird Areas ===
North Macedonia's part of the lake has been designated an Important Bird Area (IBA) by BirdLife International because it supports populations of ferruginous ducks, tufted ducks, Dalmatian pelicans and pygmy cormorants. The Albanian part of the lake is a separate but corresponding IBA for the same reason, as is the Greek southern section of the lake.

== Gallery ==
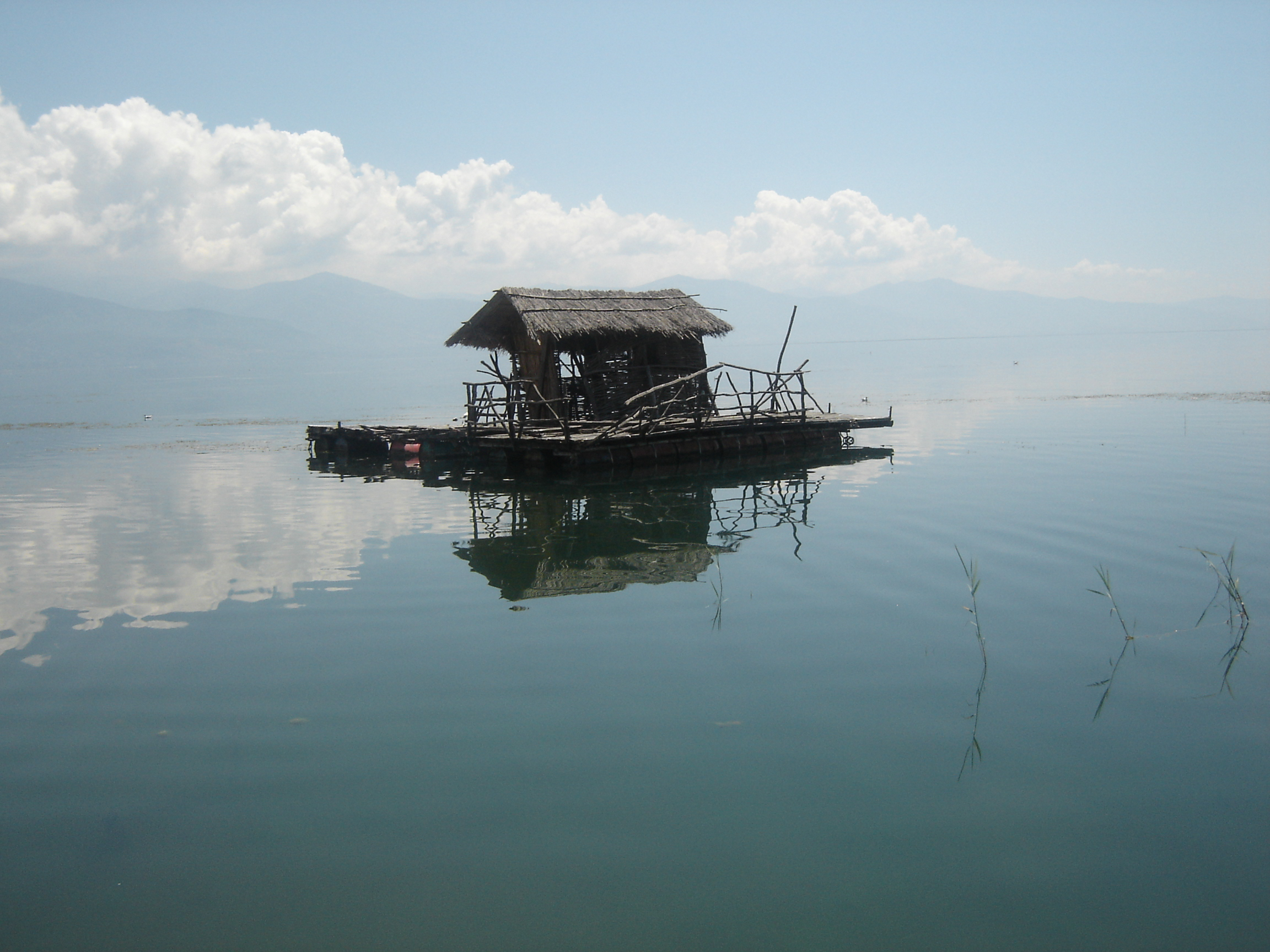
Fisherman's hut in Oteševo, North Macedonia

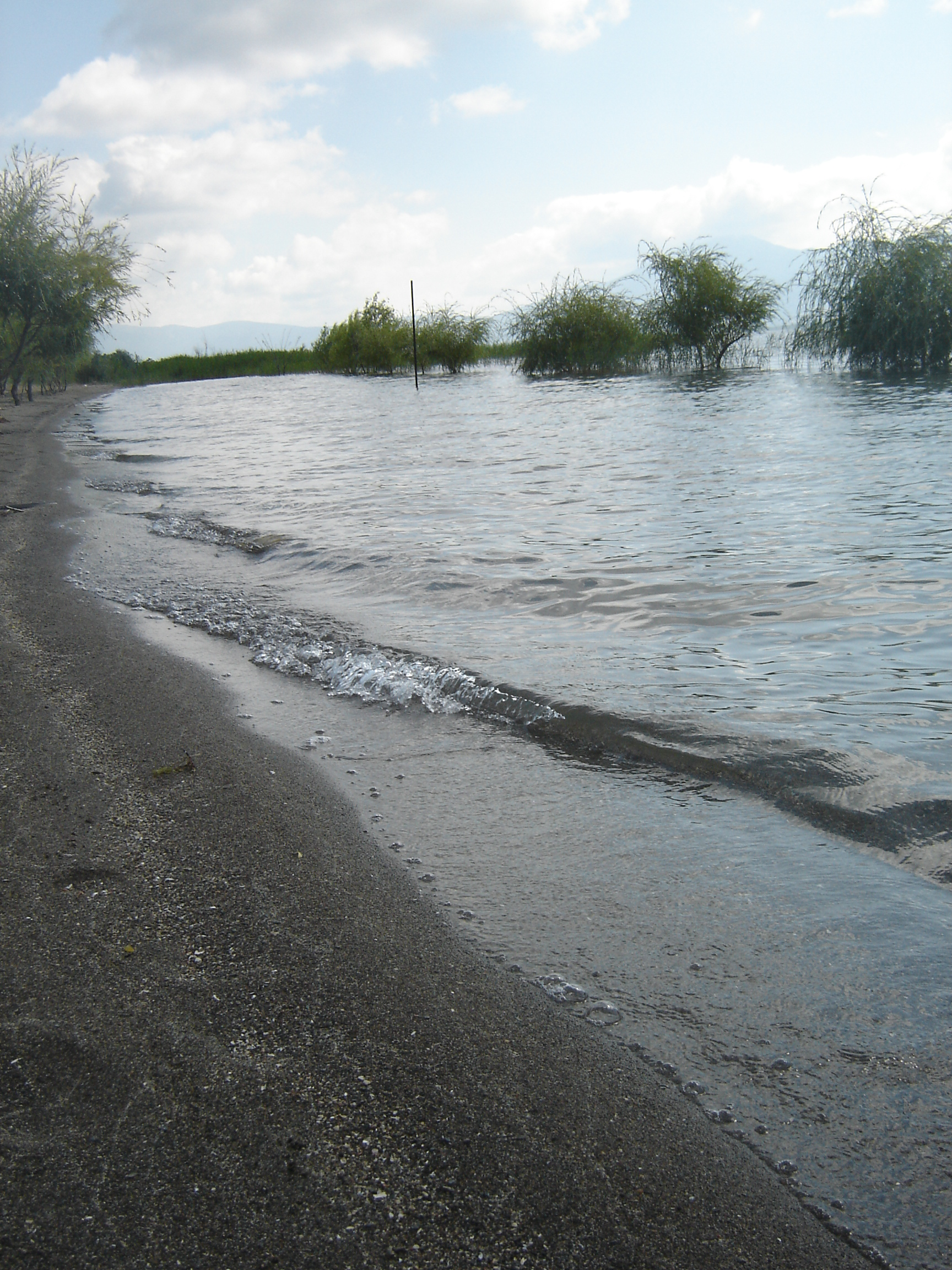
Beach "Ribarsko Selo" in Oteševo, North Macedonia

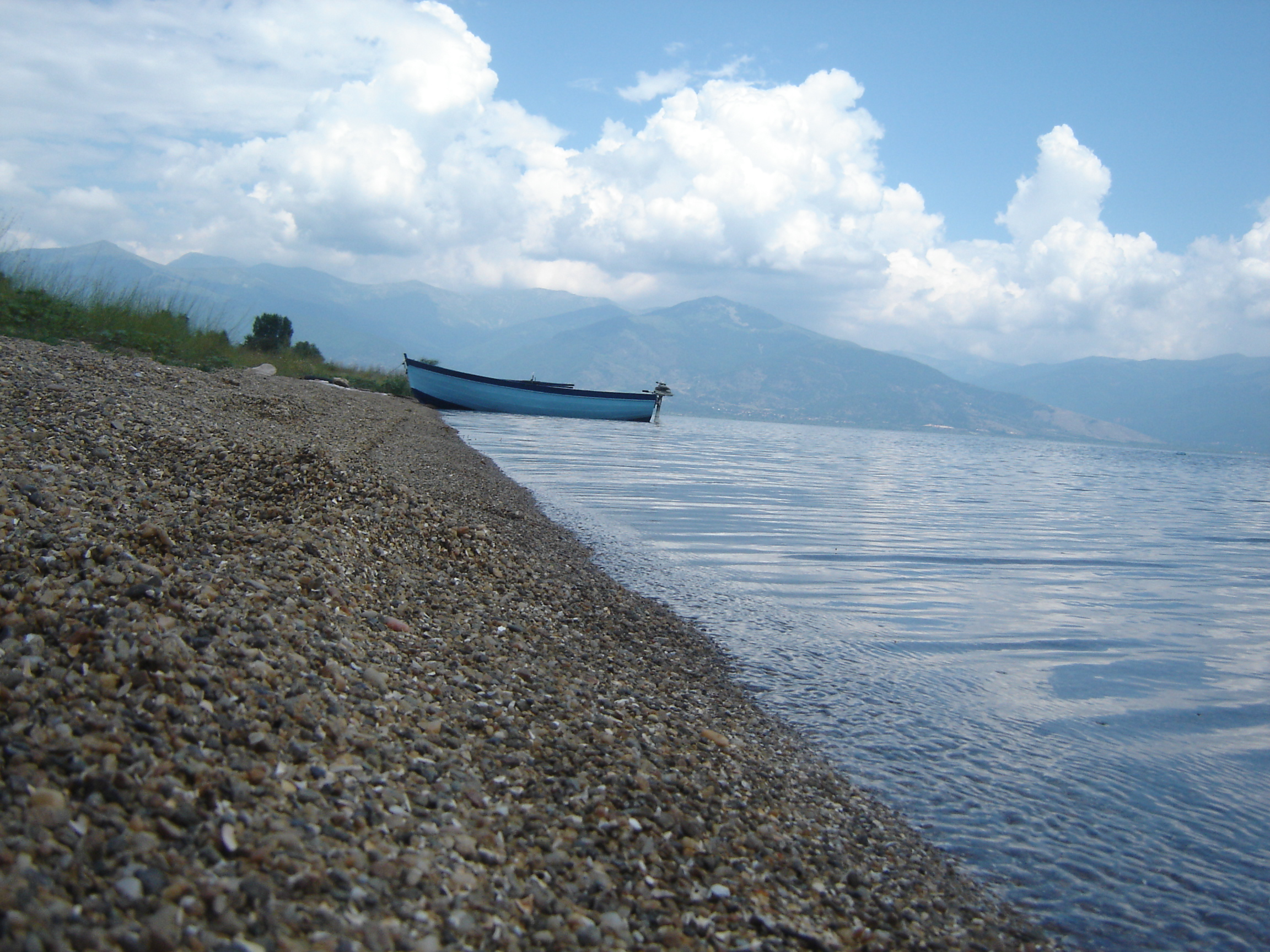
Beach at Konjsko, North Macedonia

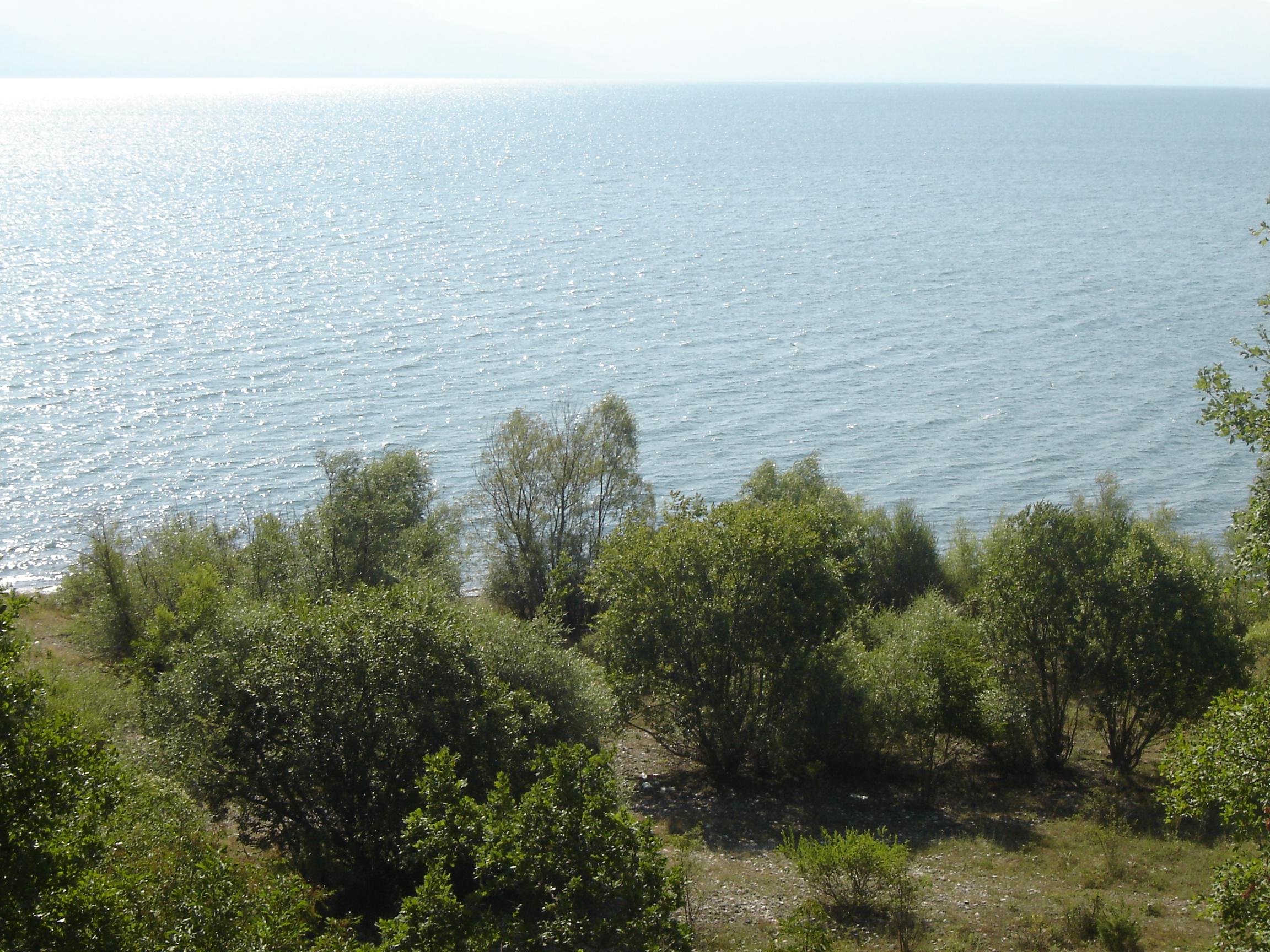
Prespa as seen from Oteševo - Stenje route in North Macedonia

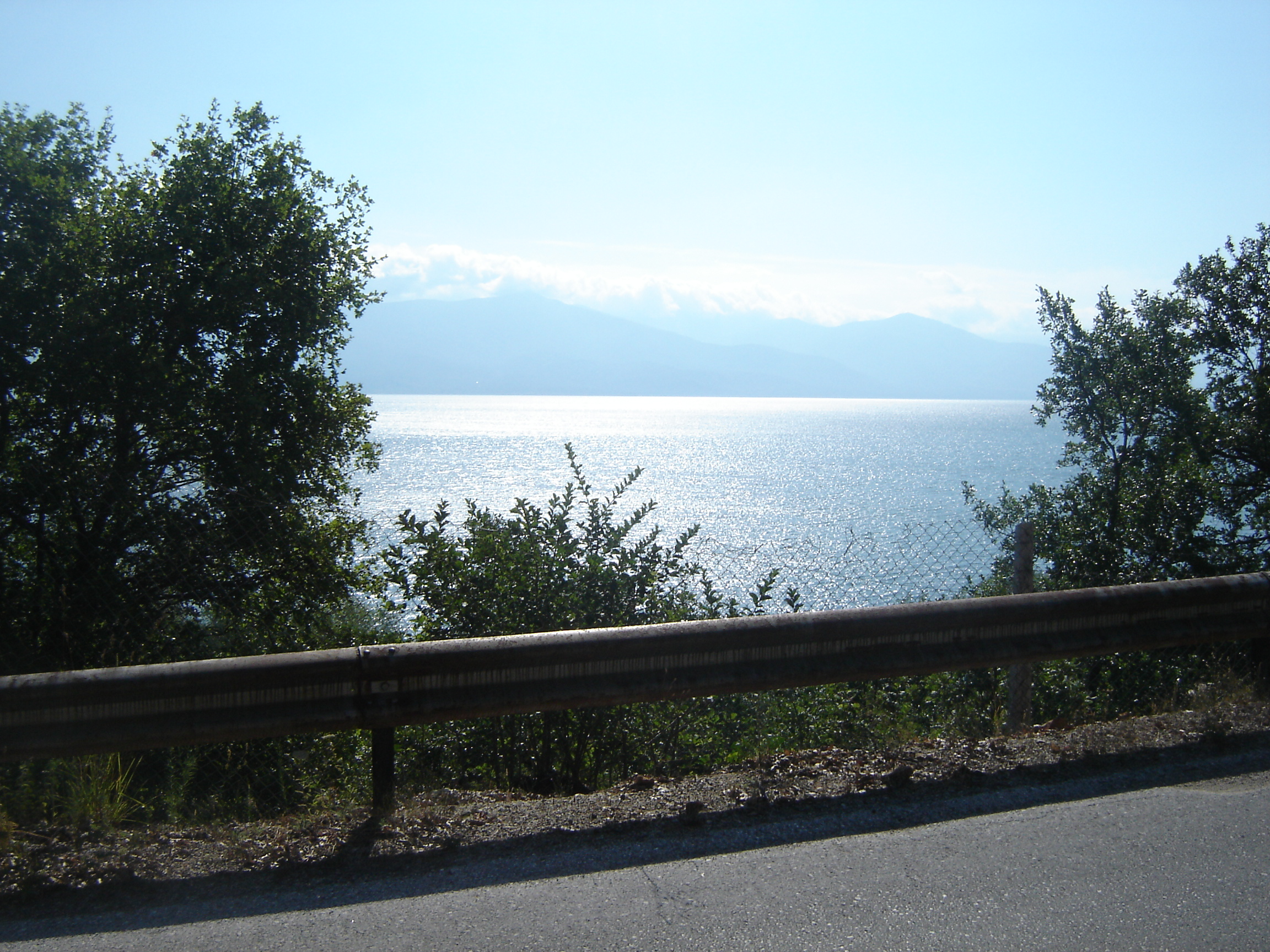
The lake as seen from Oteševo - Stenje route

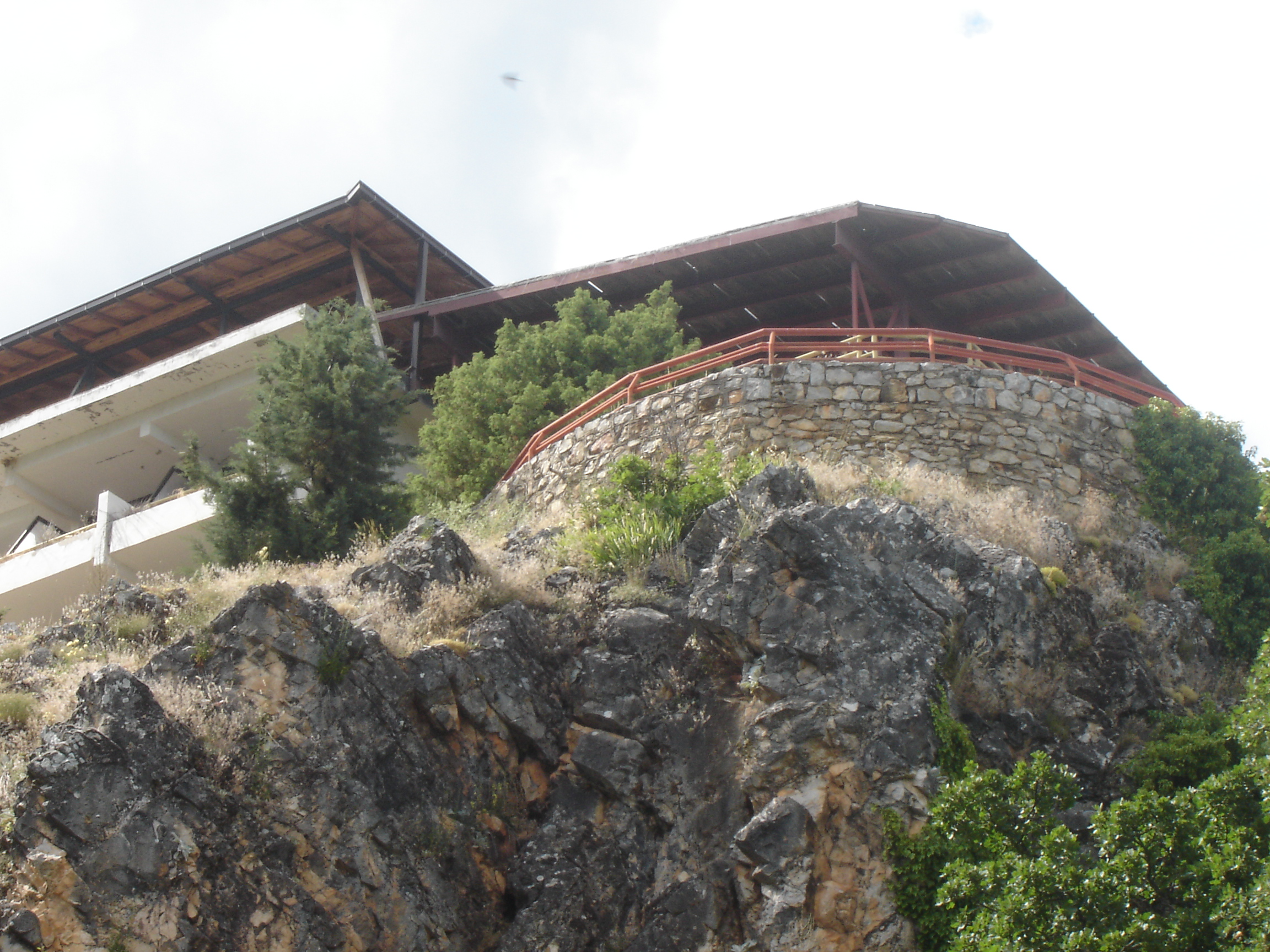
"Evropa" hotel in Oteševo, now abandoned

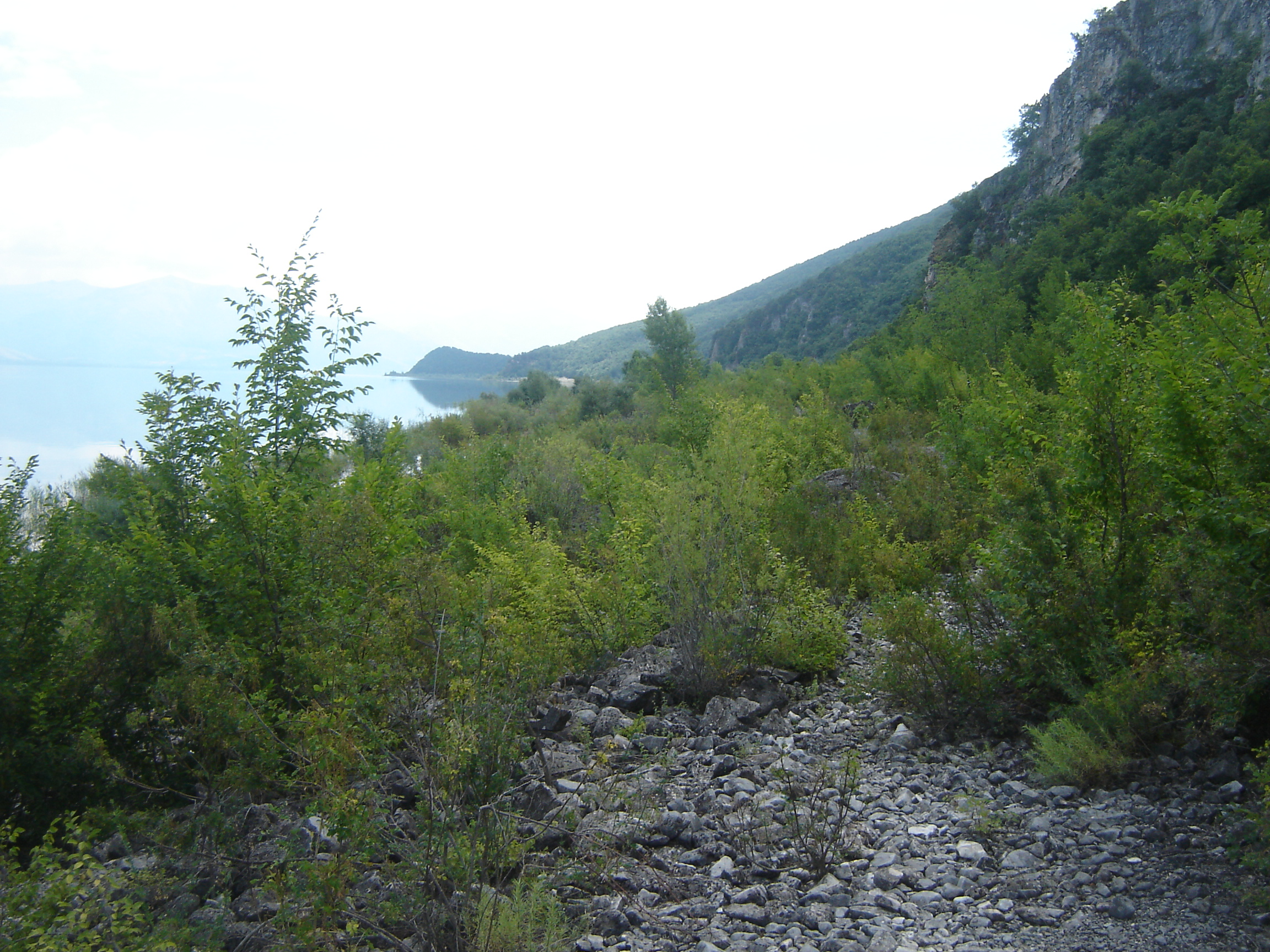
The southern shoreline (Stenje - Konjsko)

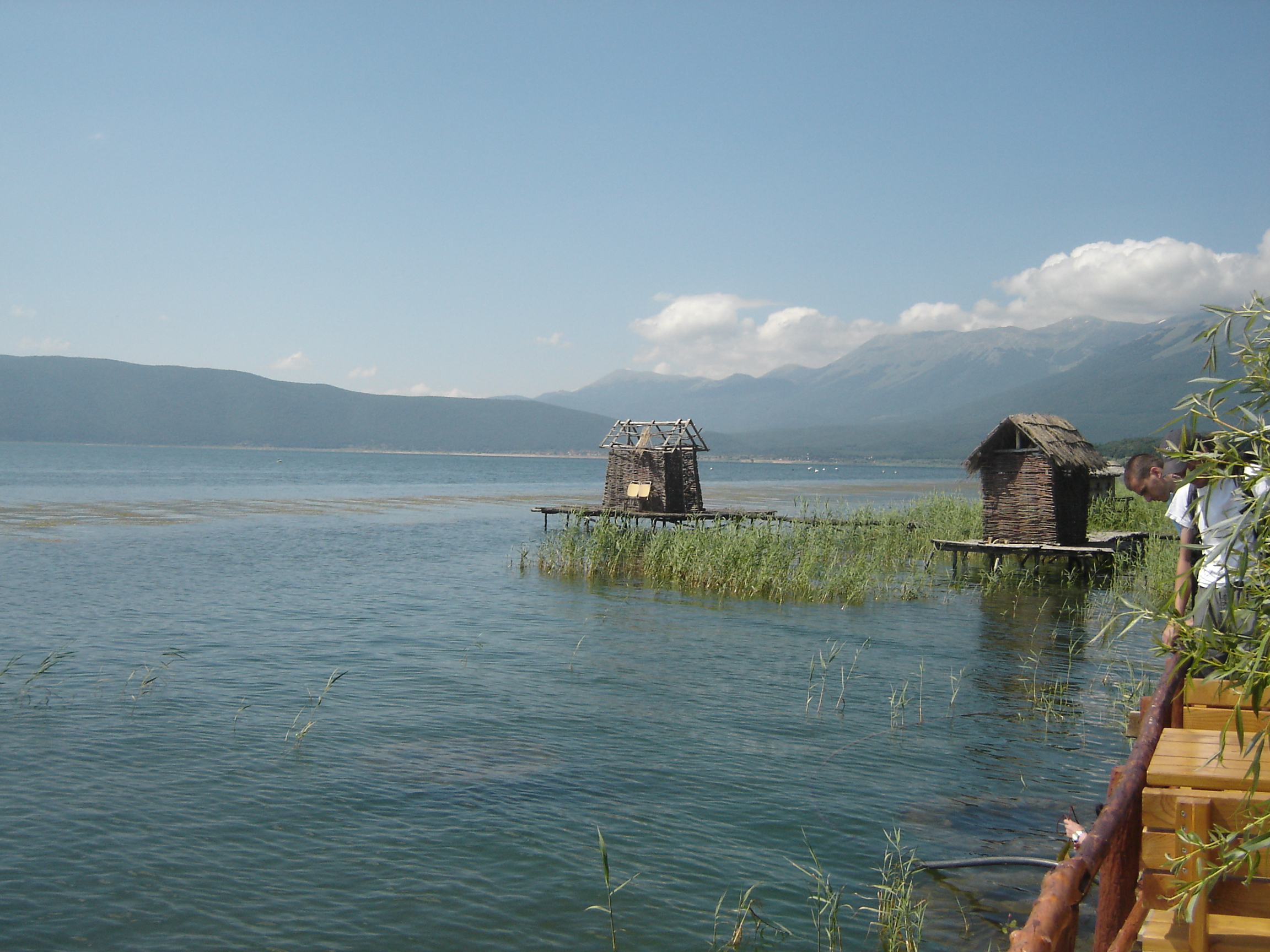
Fisherman's huts at "Ribarsko Selo"

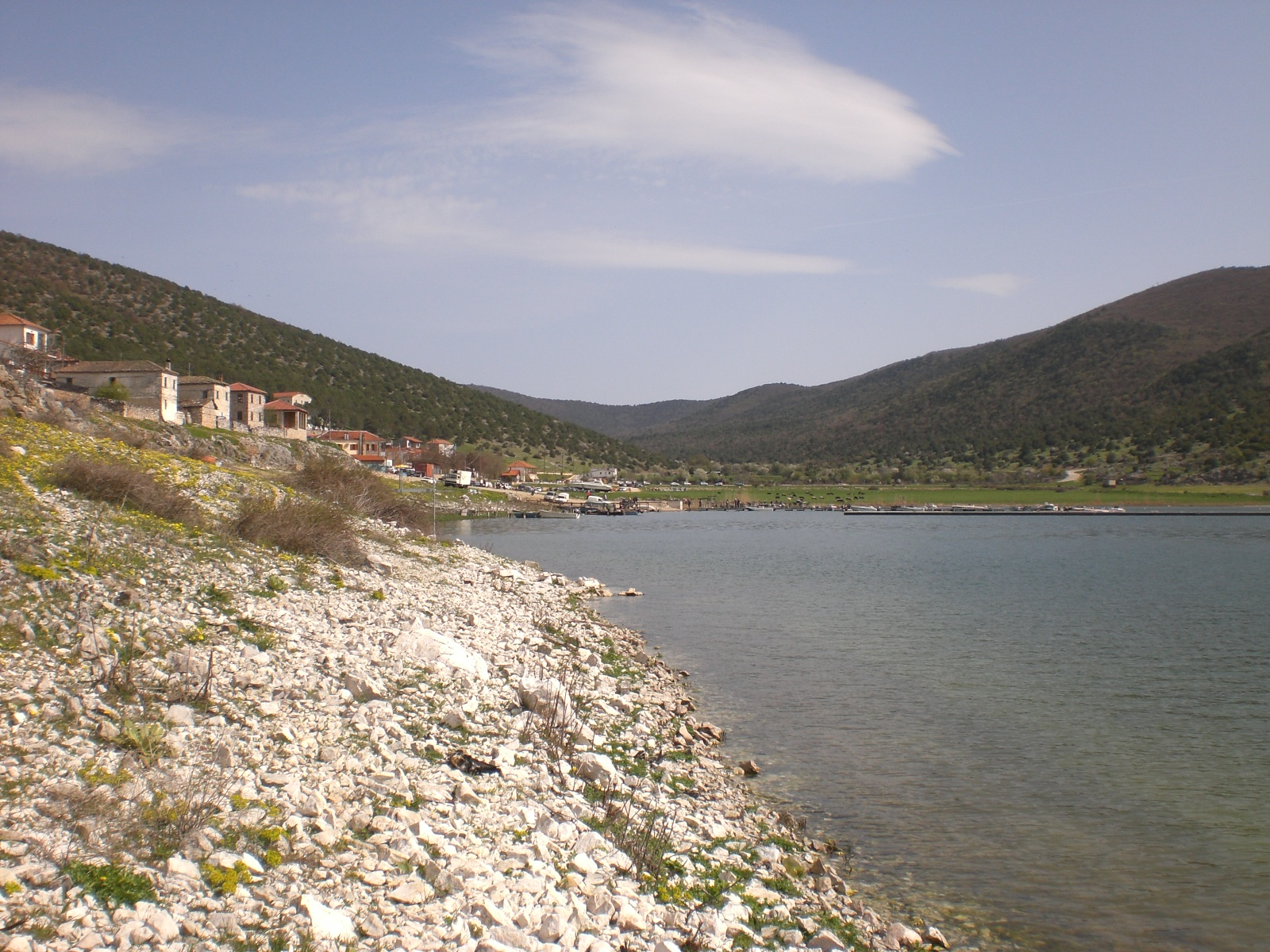
Shoreline along the Greek side

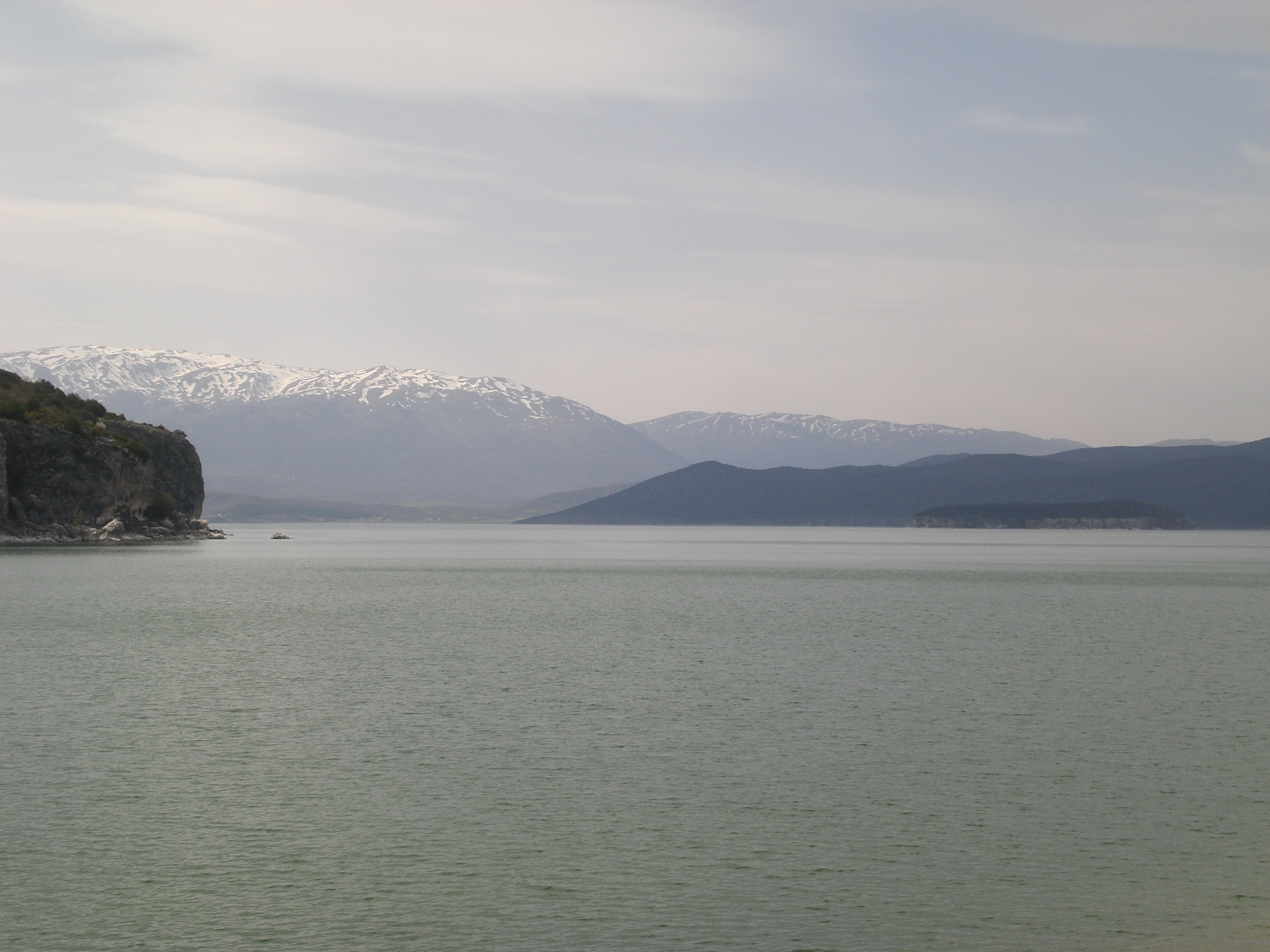
View from Greek side

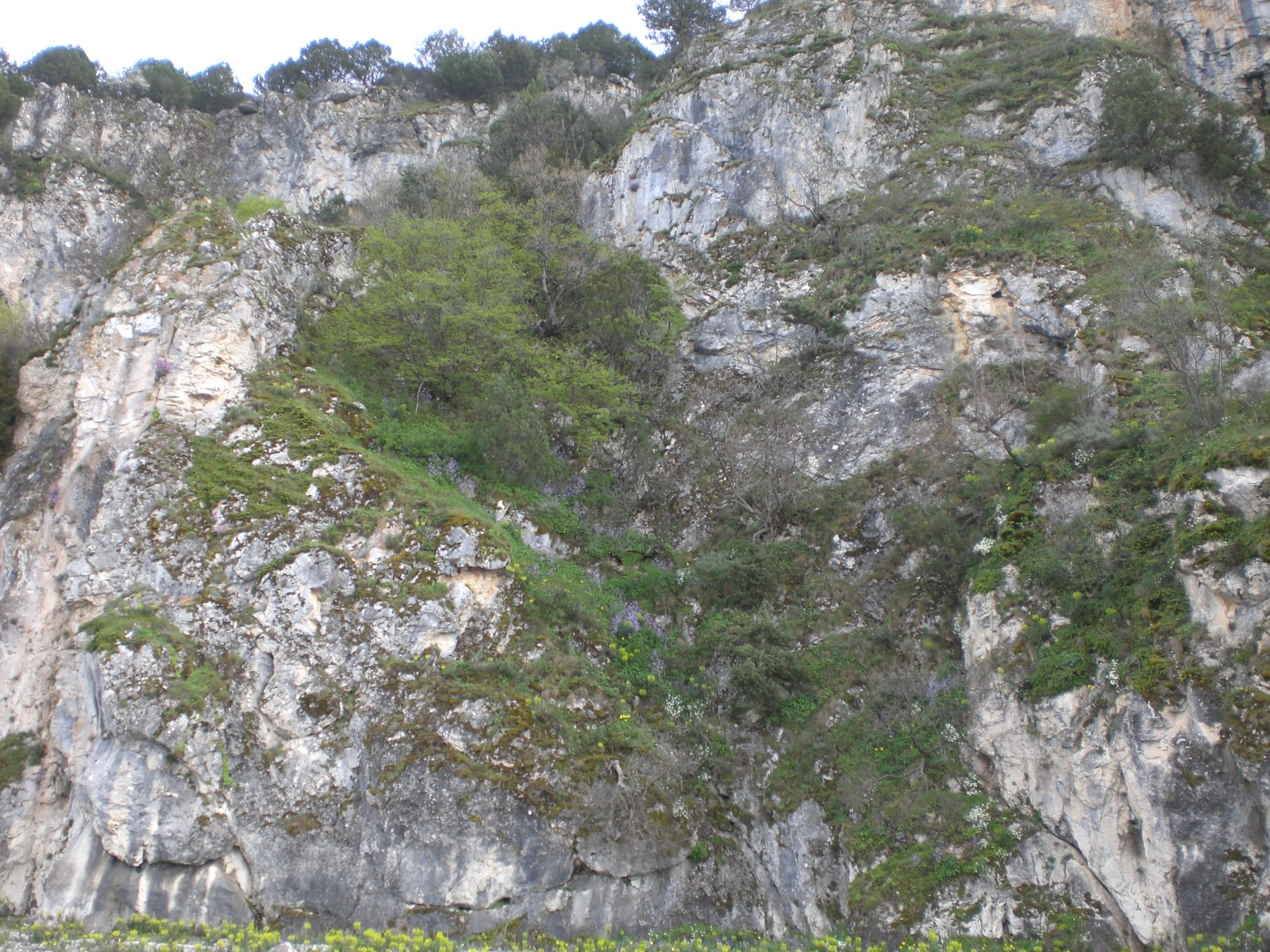
Cliff face around Greek side

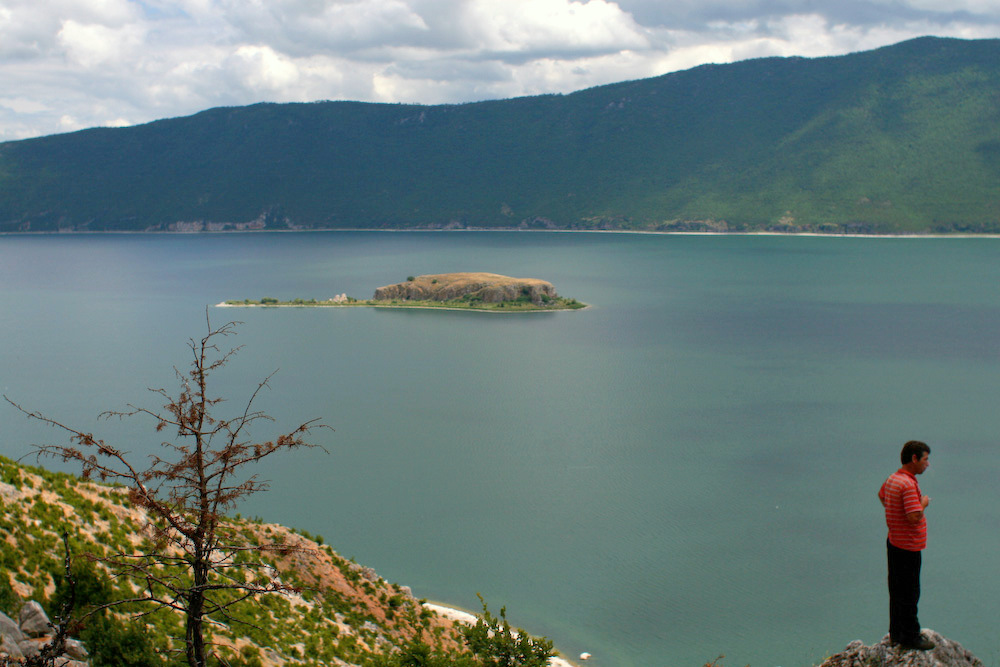
Maligrad Island in Albania

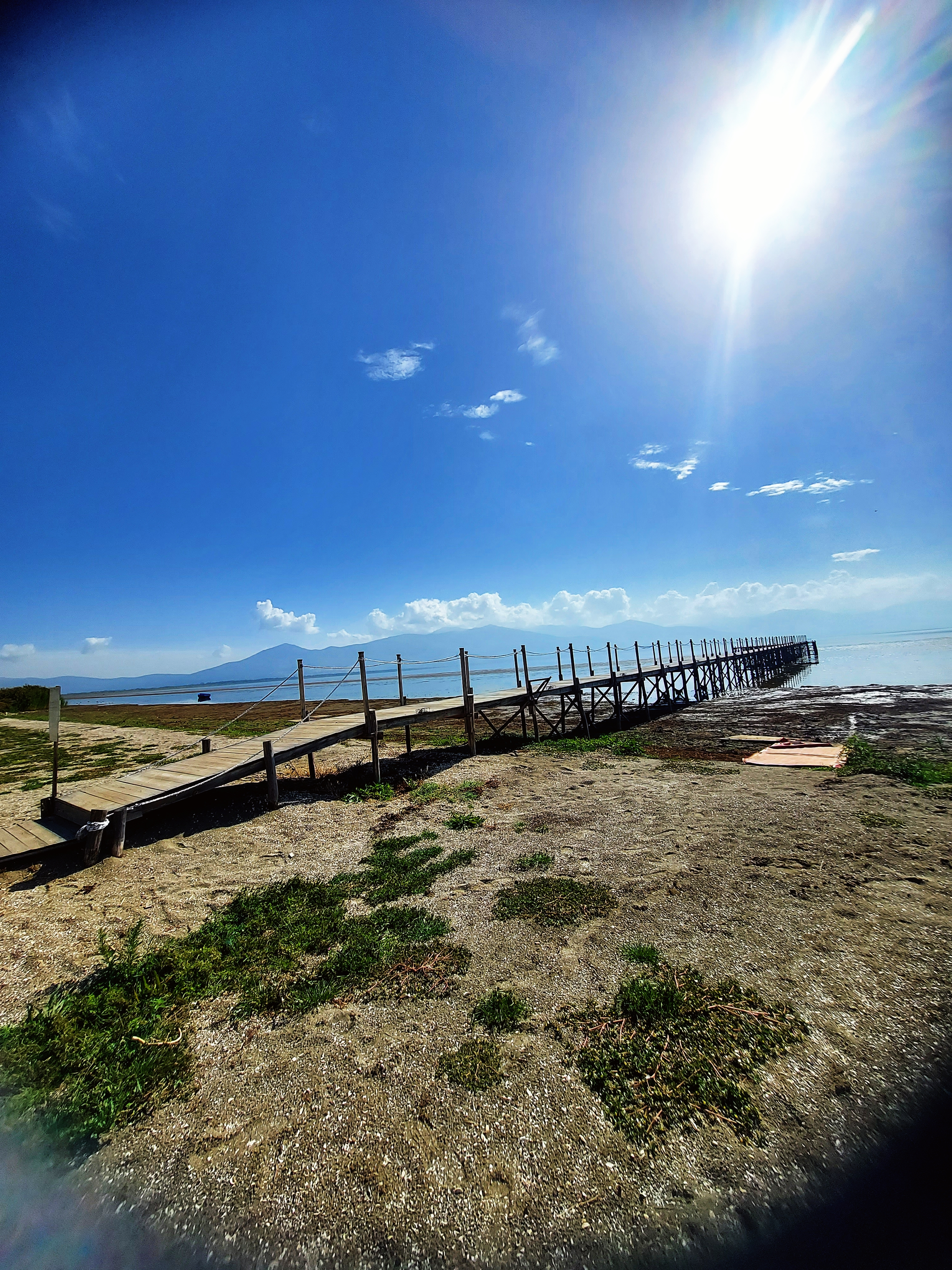
A platform in Lake Prespa

== See also ==
- Prespa, adjacent region in North Macedonia
- Prespa e Vogël and Gollobordë, adjacent region in Albania
- Prespa National Park
- Prespes, adjacent municipality in Greece

== Sources ==
- "Prespa, Lake". Encyclopædia Britannica, 2005.
- "Prespa, Lake". The Columbia Encyclopedia, 2004.
