= United Nations Security Council Resolution 845 =

UN Security Council Resolution 845
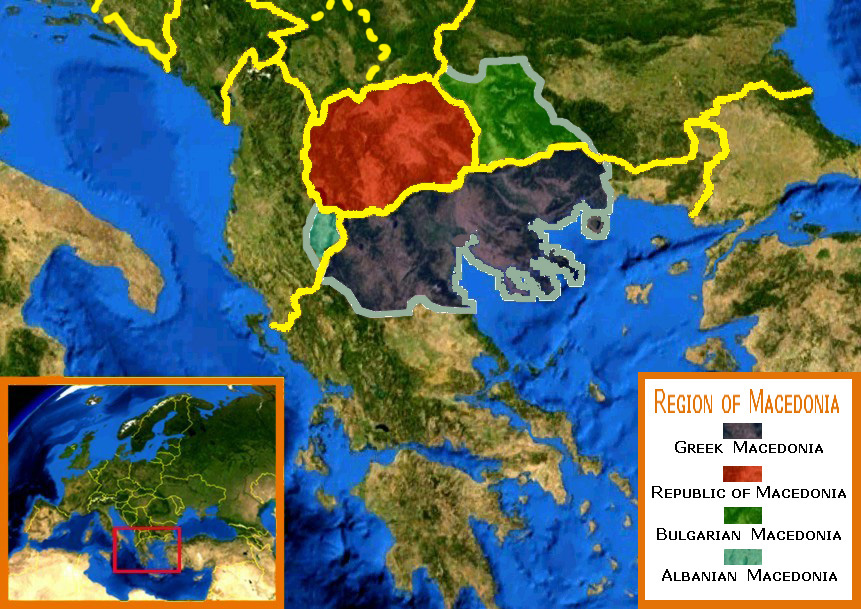
- The region of Macedonia in the Republic of Macedonia (red) and Greece (blue)
- Date: 18 June 1993
- Meeting no.: 3,243
- Code: S/RES/845 (Document)
- Subject: Former Yugoslav Republic of Macedonia
- Voting summary: 15 voted for; None voted against; None abstained
- Result: Adopted

Security Council composition
- Permanent members: China; France; Russia; United Kingdom; United States
- Non-permanent members: Brazil; Cape Verde; Djibouti; Hungary; Japan; Morocco; New Zealand; Pakistan; Spain; Venezuela

United Nations Security Council resolution 845, adopted unanimously on 18 June 1993, after recalling Resolution 817 (1993) and considering the secretary-General's report pursuant to it, the council urged both Greece and the Republic of Macedonia to continue efforts to settle the naming dispute.

The efforts of the co-chairmen of the Steering Committee of the International Conference on the Former Yugoslavia were appreciated, while the Secretary-General Boutros Boutros-Ghali was requested to keep the Security Council regularly updated, with the aim of settling the issue before the 48th session of the General Assembly in September 1993.

== See also ==
- Foreign relations of the Republic of Macedonia
- List of United Nations Security Council Resolutions 801 to 900 (1993–1994)
- Macedonia (terminology)
- List of United Nations Security Council Resolutions related to the conflicts in former Yugoslavia
