= List of countries' positions in the Macedonia naming dispute =

List of countries/entities that used "Republic of Macedonia" in bilateral diplomatic relations. that used "the former Yugoslav Republic of Macedonia" for all official purposes. whose official position on the issue was unknown. that have had no diplomatic relations with the country prior to the resolving of the dispute

This article is a list of countries and international organizations based on their official position in the Macedonia naming dispute between Greece and the then-named Macedonia (now North Macedonia). The naming dispute was resolved in February 2019 after the signing of the Prespa Agreement.

== Countries/entities that used "Republic of Macedonia" for bilateral purposes ==
According to statements of the Macedonian government, 134 foreign nations had recognized the country under the name of "Republic of Macedonia" as of January 2017. Some had used this name from the outset, others switched their stance after originally using the UN reference "the former Yugoslav Republic of Macedonia" (notably the United States under George W. Bush's administration), while, less commonly, the opposite also had been observed (as in the case of Mexico, withdrawing its previous recognition).

The following list consists of some of the countries and entities that used the name "Republic of Macedonia".

Permanent members of the UN Security Council, except France:

- United States of America (NATO and G7 member)
- United Kingdom (NATO and G7 member)
- People's Republic of China
- Russia

States formerly part of SFR Yugoslavia:

- Bosnia-Herzegovina
- Croatia (EU and NATO member)
- Montenegro (NATO member)
- Serbia
- Slovenia (EU and NATO member)
- Kosovo

Others:

- Algeria
- Andorra
- Argentina
- Austria (EU member)
- Azerbaijan
- Bahrain
- Bangladesh
- Belarus
- Botswana
- Bolivia
- Brazil
- Brunei
- Bulgaria (EU and NATO member)
- Burundi
- Cambodia
- Canada (NATO and G8 member)
- Chad
- Chile
- Costa Rica
- Cuba
- Czech Republic (EU and NATO member)
- Djibouti
- East Timor
- El Salvador
- Estonia (EU and NATO member)
- Fiji
- Finland ( NATO and EU Member)
- Guatemala
- Guinea
- Haiti
- Honduras
- Hungary (EU and NATO member)
- Iceland (NATO Member)
- India
- Indonesia
- Iran
- Iraq
- Ireland (EU member)
- Israel
- Jamaica
- Kazakhstan
- Kuwait
- Laos
- Liechtenstein
- Lithuania (EU and NATO member)
- Luxembourg (EU and NATO member)
- Malaysia
- Malta (EU member)
- Mauritius
- Moldova
- Mongolia
- Morocco
- Mozambique
- Monaco
- Myanmar (Burma)
- Namibia
- Nepal
- Nicaragua
- Nigeria
- North Korea
- Norway (NATO member)
- Oman
- Pakistan
- Paraguay
- Peru
- Philippines
- Poland (EU and NATO member)
- Qatar
- Romania (EU and NATO member)
- Rwanda
- Saudi Arabia
- Seychelles
- Singapore
- Slovakia (EU and NATO member)
- Sri Lanka
- Sudan
- Suriname
- Swaziland
- Sweden (EU and NATO member)
- Switzerland
- Syria
- Tanzania
- Tajikistan
- Thailand
- Turkey (NATO member)
- Turkmenistan
- Tuvalu
- Uganda
- Ukraine
- United Arab Emirates
- Uruguay
- Venezuela
- Vietnam
- Zambia
- Zimbabwe

== Countries/entities that used "the former Yugoslav Republic of Macedonia" for all official purposes ==
- Australia
- Belgium (EU and NATO member)
- Cyprus (no diplomatic relations; EU member)
- Denmark (EU and NATO member)
- Egypt
- France (EU, NATO, G8 and permanent UN Security Council member)
- Germany (EU, NATO and G8 member)
- Greece (EU and NATO member)
- Italy (EU, NATO and G8 member)
- Japan (G8 member)
- Latvia (EU and NATO member)
- Mexico
- Netherlands (EU and NATO member)
- New Zealand
- Portugal (EU and NATO member)
- South Africa (no diplomatic relations)
- Sovereign Military Order of Malta
- Spain (EU and NATO member)

== Countries/entities where naming was unclear ==
Conflicting or inconclusive reports on name usage or recognition:

- Afghanistan
- Albania (NATO member)
- Angola
- Antigua and Barbuda
- Armenia
- Belize
- Benin
- Burkina Faso
- Cameroon
- Cape Verde
- Central African Republic
- Colombia
- Comoros
- Congo
- Democratic Republic of the Congo
- Dominica
- Dominican Republic
- Ecuador
- Equatorial Guinea
- Eritrea
- Ethiopia
- Gabon
- Gambia
- Georgia
- Ghana
- Guinea-Bissau
- Guyana
- Ivory Coast
- Jordan
- Kenya
- Kyrgyzstan
- Lesotho
- Libya
- Madagascar
- Malawi
- Maldives
- Marshall Islands
- Mauritania
- Micronesia, Federated States of
- Nauru
- Niger
- Panama
- Saint Lucia
- Saint Vincent and the Grenadines
- Samoa
- Sao Tome and Principe
- Senegal
- Sierra Leone
- Somalia
- South Korea
- Republic of China (Taiwan) (no diplomatic relations since 2001)
- Togo
- Uzbekistan
- Vanuatu
- Vatican City
- Yemen

== No reports on name usage or recognition ==
These countries/entities have no diplomatic relations with the state:

- Bahamas
- Barbados
- Bhutan
- Cook Islands
- Grenada
- South Sudan
- Kiribati
- Lebanon
- Liberia
- Mali
- Niue
- Palau
- Papua New Guinea
- Solomon Islands
- Tonga
- Trinidad and Tobago

=== States with limited recognition ===
- Abkhazia
- Nagorno-Karabakh
- Northern Cyprus
- Palestine
- Sahrawi Arab Democratic Republic
- Somaliland
- South Ossetia
- Transnistria

== International organizations ==
The following international organizations had used the reference adopted by the UN – "former Yugoslav Republic of Macedonia" (or a variant thereof) in their official proceedings:

- United Nations - At the UN Headquarters in New York, member states' flags are flown in alphabetical order of their English names; during the dispute, the republic's flag was sorted under "T" for "The Former Yugoslav Republic of Macedonia".
- European Union
- NATO - A footnote was included in all referring documents that Turkey recognizes the country as Macedonia
- International Monetary Fund
- OECD and DAC–OECD (Development Co-operation Directorate),
- World Trade Organization
- International Olympic Committee
- International Paralympic Committee
- World Bank
- Council of Europe
- European Bank for Reconstruction and Development
- Organization for Security and Co-operation in Europe
- FIFA
- UEFA
- FIBA
- CERN
- EBU
- FIDE
- Organisation internationale de la Francophonie
- International Mathematics Olympiad
- Association of Tennis Professionals
