= United Nations Security Council Resolution 817 =

UN Security Council Resolution 817
- Location of the Republic of Macedonia)
- Date: 7 April 1993
- Meeting no.: 3,196
- Code: S/RES/817 (Document)
- Subject: Admission of new Members to the UN: Macedonia
- Voting summary: 15 voted for; None voted against; None abstained
- Result: Adopted

Security Council composition
- Permanent members: China; France; Russia; United Kingdom; United States
- Non-permanent members: Brazil; Cape Verde; Djibouti; Hungary; Japan; Morocco; New Zealand; Pakistan; Spain; Venezuela

United Nations Security Council resolution 817, adopted unanimously on 7 April 1993, after examining the application of the Republic of Macedonia for membership in the United Nations, the council recommended to the General Assembly that Macedonia be admitted to membership in the United Nations.

However, the council also noted the differences that had arisen over the name of the state and welcomed the co-chairmen of the Steering Committee of the International Conference on the Former Yugoslavia for their efforts to settle the dispute. For this reason, the council decided that the state should be admitted under the provisional name of the "former Yugoslav Republic of Macedonia" until the dispute was resolved.

== See also ==
- List of United Nations member states
- List of United Nations Security Council Resolutions 801 to 900 (1993–1994)
- Macedonia (terminology)
- United Nations Security Council Resolution 845
- List of United Nations Security Council Resolutions related to the conflicts in former Yugoslavia
