= Adamantios Vassilakis =

Greek diplomat

Adamantios Vassilakis (Greek: Αδαμάντιος Βασιλάκης; June 13, 1942 – 30 June 2021) was a distinguished Greek diplomat and negotiator.

Adamantios Vassilakis was a graduate of the Commercial High School of Chios, Greece, and held a Licence in Political and Diplomatic Sciences from the Free University of Brussels.

Vassilakis joined the Diplomatic Service of the Greek Ministry of Foreign Affairs in 1972 as Embassy Attaché. He was appointed Third Secretary of Embassy at the Greek Embassy in Tirana, Albania in 1975. In 1977, he moved to the Foreign Ministry's First Department of Political Affairs, serving as Head of Section for the U.S.S.R. and Eastern Europe, as a member of various Greek delegations visiting Eastern European countries, and as a participant in the North Atlantic Treaty Organization (NATO) and Common Market political experts meetings.

In 1985, Vassilakis was appointed Consul General of Greece in San Francisco, California, where he was promoted to First Counselor of Embassy, and, in 1989, Head of Section for bilateral relations with the United States, Iranian, Turkish and Arab Countries, in the Foreign Ministry's Department of Bilateral Economic Relations. In 1990, Mr. Vassilakis entered the Department of European Community Affairs. In 1991, he was named Deputy Permanent Representative in the Permanent Mission of Greece to the United Nations, and in 1994, he became Chargé d'Affaires, a.i.

From 1999 to 2002 Vassilakis served as Director General for European Affairs and Director of the Center for Analysis and Planning in Greece's Ministry of Foreign Affairs. Those assignments followed his promotion, in 1998, to Minister Plenipotentiary (1st class).

From 2002 to 2007 he served as Permanent Representative of Greece to the United Nations and represented Greece on the United Nations Security Council.

From 2007 until the resolution in 2018 he served as Greece's chief negotiator and representative in the UN-led talks between Greece and the Republic of North Macedonia over the Macedonia naming dispute.

Vassilakis died at the age of 79 on 30 June 2021.

== See also ==
- Macedonia naming dispute
- Macedonian accession to the European Union
- Βικιπαίδεια
