= Matthew Nimetz =

American lawyer (b.1939)

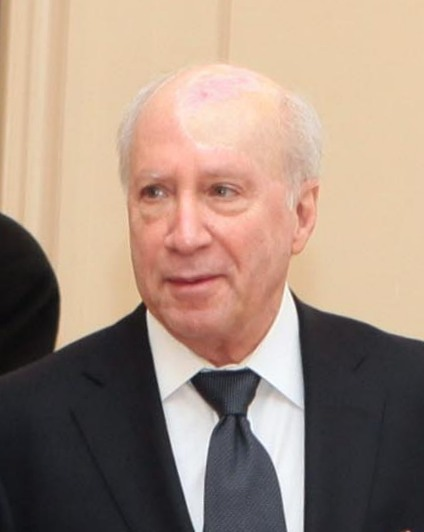

5th Under Secretary of State for International Security Affairs
- In office February 21, 1980 – December 5, 1980
- President: Jimmy Carter
- Preceded by: Lucy W. Benson
- Succeeded by: James L. Buckley

18th Counselor of the United States Department of State
- In office April 8, 1977 – March 19, 1980
- President: Jimmy Carter
- Preceded by: Helmut Sonnenfeldt
- Succeeded by: Rozanne L. Ridgway

Personal details
- Born: June 17, 1939 (age 87) New York City, New York, U.S.
- Party: Democratic
- Education: Williams College (BA); Balliol College, Oxford (BA); Harvard University (LLB)

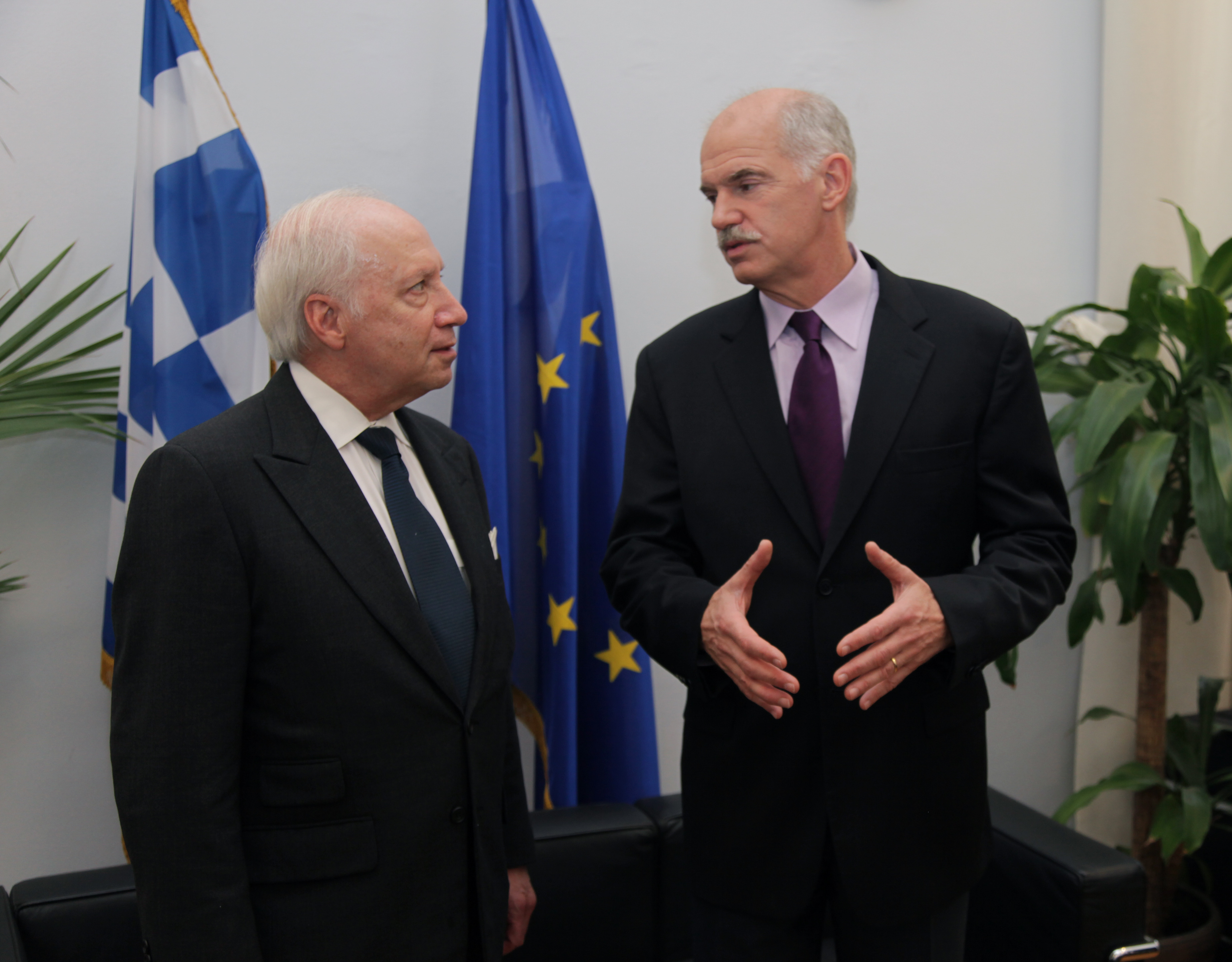
Matthew Nimetz (left) with George Papandreou during a July 2009 meeting

Matthew Nimetz (/ˈnɪmɪts/; born June 17, 1939) is an American diplomat and a former lawyer and retired managing director of a global private equity firm. He was the United Nations Special Representative for the naming dispute between Greece and the former Yugoslav Republic of Macedonia (now Republic of North Macedonia). He was also the Under Secretary of State for Security Assistance, Science, and Technology.

== Early life ==
Matthew Nimetz was born on June 17, 1939, in Brooklyn, New York City, to a Jewish family. He is the son of Joseph and Elsie Nimetz and was educated in the Brooklyn public school system (Erasmus Hall High School, 1956) and at Williams College where he received a BA in 1960. He subsequently was a Rhodes Scholar and received a BA from Balliol College, Oxford, in 1962, which was upgraded to an MA in 1966. He received his LLB from Harvard Law School in 1965, where he was President of the Harvard Law Review.

== Career ==
He served as law clerk to Supreme Court Justice John Marshall Harlan II from 1965 to 1967, before serving as a staff assistant to President Lyndon B. Johnson until 1969, where he worked on the domestic policy staff under Joseph A. Califano Jr. At the White House he worked on many of the Great Society programs relating to civil rights, crime, housing, environmental and conservation issues, and other related programs. He was liaison with various government departments relating to domestic violence following the assassination of Martin Luther King Jr. and during the Poor People's Campaign in Washington, D.C. in 1968. Following his stay at the White House, he worked with the New York City law firm Simpson Thacher & Bartlett as an associate from 1969 to 1973 and as a partner from 1974 to 1977. While at Simpson Thacher he took a leave of absence to serve as director of the transition of Governor-Elect Hugh Carey of New York in 1974–5. He was appointed by Governor Hugh Carey as the Governor's first commissioner of the Port Authority of New York. He was also appointed as a member of the New York Health Advisory Council from 1975 to 1977.

In January 1977, Nimetz was appointed by President Jimmy Carter as Counselor of the United States Department of State. In that capacity he reported to and advised Secretary of State Cyrus Vance and had special responsibilities in connection with the Cyprus issue, Eastern Mediterranean issues including Greek-Turkish disputes, implementation of the Helsinki Accords and other issues involving Eastern/Central Europe, Mexico–United States border issues, the Micronesian status negotiations, and other matters. He was the senior State Department official involved in the return of the Crown of St. Stephen and other coronation regalia by the United States to Hungary in 1978 and testified before a Congressional Committee relating to the decision to return the crown, which had been entrusted to US forces following the defeat of Hungary in World War II. In December 1979, he was promoted to the post of Under Secretary for Security Assistance, Science and Technology. He was responsible for the supervision of United States security assistance programs, nuclear nonproliferation and the implementation of the State Department's international scientific and technological programs. These included sales of military weapons and related material to other countries, and such other areas such as scientific and technical cooperation, nuclear nonproliferation issues, environmental matters, and the US Government's international communications activities. He also continued to be responsible for supervising US policy on the eastern Mediterranean and eastern European countries.

After the end of the Carter Administration in January 1981, Nimetz returned to the private sector. He became a partner in the New York law firm Paul, Weiss, Rifkind, Wharton & Garrison, where he concentrated in corporate and international law. During his 19-year tenure at the Paul Weiss law firm he served on the Executive Committee, as chair of the firm and as head of the corporate department. He moved to join one of his long time clients, the private equity investment firm General Atlantic LLC in January 2000, where he served as a managing director and as Chief Operating Officer through December 2011, when he became an Advisory Director. At General Atlantic, Nimetz was an important part of the team that built General Atlantic into a global growth equity firm with a successful record of investing in growth companies, primarily those that had a technological component. In May 2007 he was again appointed as a Commissioner of the Port Authority of New York by Governor Eliot Spitzer but, upon the resignation of Governor Spitzer, his nomination was not acted upon for confirmation by the State Senate.

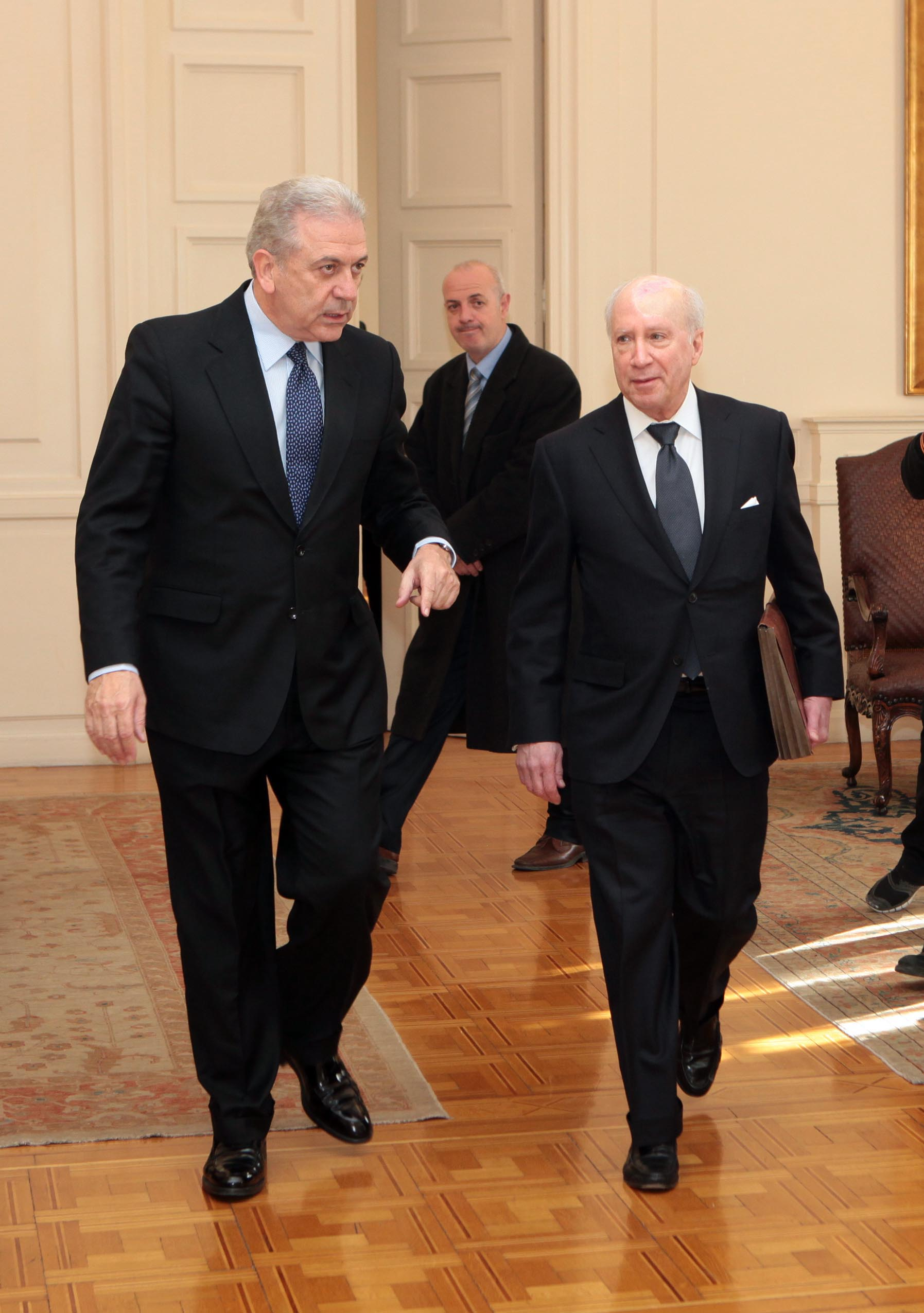
Matthew Nimetz meeting with the Greek Foreign Minister Dimitris Avramopoulos in Athens in 2013

From March 1994 to September 1995, he served as President Bill Clinton's Special Envoy to mediate the resolution of the Macedonian Issue, an important regional dispute that the United Nations Security Council had acted upon, involving both a national name and related disputes. The United Nations mediator of this dispute was Cyrus Vance, former US Secretary of State, and Nimetz worked with Vance to assist the parties to reach agreement on a number of important points, which culminated in the signing of the Interim Agreement of September 13, 1995, by Greece and its northern neighbor, now officially known as the Republic of North Macedonia (but at that time admitted to the United Nations under the temporary designation "The Former Yugoslav Republic of Macedonia"), at the United Nations which resolved many of the issues between the two countries. Nimetz has written about the dispute in an article "The Macedonian "Name" Dispute: The Macedonian Question—Resolved?" in Nationalities Papers, Vol. 48, March 2020.

The major issues between the two neighbors were not, however, resolved in the Interim Agreement, and in 1999, Nimetz was appointed to succeed Cyrus Vance as the personal envoy of the UN secretary-general regarding the naming dispute. Nimetz has continued to work mediating between Greece and the Republic of North Macedonia, for more than two decades. He worked for a nominal salary of US$1 a year in order to find a solution suitable for all concerned. Nimetz believed that the long-running issue was capable of resolution and made a number of proposals to the two parties during the course of his mediation efforts to bring them closer to a solution. During intense efforts commencing with his proposal of January 11, 2018, the parties hammered out an agreement, negotiated primarily by the two foreign ministers, Nikola Dimitrov for North Macedonia and Nikos Kotzias of Greece, and ultimately by the two prime ministers Alexis Tsipras of Greece and Zoran Zaev of North Macedonia, with the intensive mediation support of Nimetz and his UN team. Support was provided by the European Commission and friendly states such as the United States and various members of the European Union. On June 17, 2018 an agreement to resolve the dispute with the adoption of the name "Republic of North Macedonia" was signed in at Lake Prespes (also known as Lake Prespa) on the border of the two states. After difficult processes in both countries the agreement was ratified by the parliaments of both states and came into effect in early 2019, with the change of the name of the state to Republic of North Macedonia and other actions taken to fulfill the Prespa Agreement. Following the successful resolution of the "name" dispute, Nimetz resigned in 2019 as the Personal Envoy of the Secretary-General of the United Nations. It is said that his UN mediation effort on the "name" dispute from 1999-2019 was the longest continuous mediation of one dispute by a UN mediator.

Nimetz has been a director of The Nature Conservancy of New York, trustee and founding chair of World Resources Institute, trustee emeritus of Williams College; former chair of the advisory board of SUNY Global/The Levin Institute of the University of the State of New York from 2009 through 2014, a trustee emeritus of Central European University, Vienna/Budapest;, a trustee emeritus of American University of Central Asia, Bishkek, Kirghiz Republic. H also served as a director/founding (former) chair of the Centre for Democracy and Reconciliation in Southeastern Europe, Thessaloniki, Greece, which established and supports the Joint History Project for the Balkan region; a trustee emeritus of the Rubin Museum of Art, New York; a former director and co-chair of Green City Force, Brooklyn, New York; a trustee emeritus of National Committee on American Foreign Policy; an emeritus director of Landesa, a global not-for-profit organization focused on land rights Landesa Rural Development Institute; an emeritus director of the Interfaith Center of New York; an emeritus diretor of the Scholars at Risk Network; a former director of Americans for Oxford, Inc; a former member and chair of the advisory committee for the Williams College Center for Development Economics.

Mr. Nimetz is a member of the Friends of the Drawings and Print Department of the Metropolitan Museum, and actively collects old master drawings and prints; he also is a collector of paintings ("Indian Miniatures") and bronzes from India and the Himalayan region, as well as contemporary Japanese pottery.

Mr. Nimetz lives in New York City. and has two children and five grandchildren. His wife Ann Milstein Nimetz, known professionally as Ann Guite', an art historian and art advisor, passed away in February 2026.

== See also ==
- List of law clerks for the ninth seat of the Supreme Court of the United States
