= Macedonia naming dispute =

Dispute between Greece and North Macedonia (1991–2019)

Geographical and political division of Macedonia Greek Macedonia North Macedonia

The use of the country name "Macedonia" was disputed between the nation of Greece and the Republic of Macedonia (now North Macedonia) between 1991 and 2019. The dispute was a source of instability in the Western Balkans for 25 years. It was resolved through negotiations between the two countries, mediated by the United Nations, resulting in the Prespa Agreement, which was signed on 17 June 2018. Pertinent to its background is an early 20th-century multifaceted dispute and armed conflict that formed part of the background to the Balkan Wars. The specific naming dispute, although an issue in Yugoslav–Greek relations after World War II, was reignited after the breakup of Yugoslavia and the newly-gained independence of the former Socialist Republic of Macedonia in 1991. From then, it continued to be an issue in bilateral and international relations until it was settled with the Prespa Agreement in June 2018, the subsequent ratification by the Macedonian and Greek parliaments in late 2018 and early 2019 respectively, and the renaming of Macedonia to North Macedonia in February 2019.

The dispute arose from the ambiguity in nomenclature between the Republic of Macedonia, the adjacent Greek region of Macedonia and the ancient Greek kingdom of Macedon. Citing historical and irredentist concerns, Greece opposed the use of the name "Macedonia" without a geographical qualifier such as "Northern Macedonia" for use "by all ... and for all purposes". As a significant contingent of ethnic Greeks identify themselves as Macedonians and view themselves as unrelated to ethnic Macedonians, Greece further objected to the use of the term "Macedonian" for the neighboring country's largest ethnic group and language. North Macedonia was accused by Greece of appropriating symbols and figures that are historically considered part of Greek culture such as the Vergina Sun and Alexander the Great, and of promoting the irredentist concepts of Antiquisation and United Macedonia, which involve territorial and historical claims on its neighbours and especially Greece.

The dispute escalated to the highest level of international mediation, involving numerous attempts to achieve a resolution. In 1995, the two countries formalised bilateral relations and committed to start negotiations on the naming issue, under the auspices of the United Nations. Until a solution was found, the provisional reference "the former Yugoslav Republic of Macedonia" (FYROM) was used by multiple international organisations and states. UN members, and the UN as a whole, agreed to accept any name resulting from successful negotiations between the two countries. The parties were represented by Ambassadors Vasko Naumovski and Adamantios Vassilakis with the mediation of Matthew Nimetz, who had worked on the issue since 1994.

On 12 June 2018, an agreement was reached. A referendum was held in Macedonia on 30 September 2018, with voters overwhelmingly affirming support for EU and NATO membership by accepting the Prespa Agreement. However, voter turnout was well below the 50 percent threshold needed to validate the result. Therefore, the agreement had to be ratified by the Macedonian Assembly with a two-thirds majority. After the agreement was ratified by both sides, it entered into force on 12 February 2019. On 27 March 2020, North Macedonia became the 30th member of NATO.

== History ==
=== Background ===
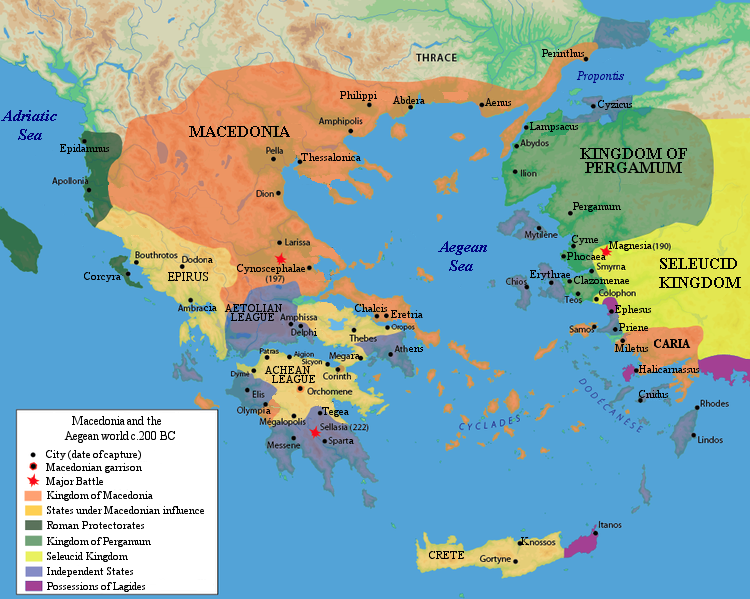
Ancient kingdom of Macedonia c. 200 BC

In antiquity, the territory of the present-day Republic of North Macedonia equated approximately to the kingdom of Paeonia, which lay immediately north of ancient Macedonia. The western and central parts of modern Greek region of Macedonia approximately corresponds to that of ancient Macedonia, while the Bulgarian part and the eastern part of the Greek area, are mostly in Ancient Thrace. After the Romans conquered Greece in 168 BC they established a large administrative district in northern Greece which added Paeonia and eastern parts of Ancient Thrace to other territories outside the original ancient Macedonia. It used the name 'Macedonia' to describe the whole of this new province. This province was divided in the 4th century CE into Macedonia Prima ("first Macedonia") in the south, encompassing most of the ancient Macedonia and southeastern parts of Ancient Thrace, coinciding with the modern Greek region of Macedonia, and Macedonia Salutaris ("wholesome Macedonia", also called Macedonia Secunda – "second Macedonia") in the north, encompassing partially Dardania, the whole of Paeonia and northeastern Thrace. Thus Macedonia Salutaris encompassed most of the present-day North Macedonia and southeastern Bulgaria. In late Roman times, the provincial boundaries were reorganized to form the Diocese of Macedonia, which was much larger. This situation lasted, with some modifications, until the 7th century.

From the beginning of the 6th century, the former Roman province, then part of the Byzantine Empire became a subject to frequent raids by Early Slavs which, in the course of next centuries, resulted in drastic demographic and cultural changes. The Slavs continued to assault the Byzantine Empire, either independently, or aided by Bulgars or Avars during the 7th century. The Byzantines organized a massive expedition against the Slavs in the area. They subdued many Slavic tribes and established a new theme of Thrace in the hinterland of Thessaloniki. A new theme called Macedonia was created in the late 8th century from the older theme of Thrace. Most of the modern region of Macedonia became in the 9th century a Bulgarian province known as Kutmichevitsa. Its southern parts corresponded to new Byzantine provinces of Thessalonica and Strymon. The area of North Macedonia was incorporated again into the Byzantine Empire in the early 11th century as a new province called Bulgaria. As a result for nearly thousand years the name of Macedonia had different meanings for Western Europeans and for the Balkan people. For the Westerners it denoted the territory of the Ancient Macedonia, but for the Balkan Christians, when rarely used, it covered the territories of the former Byzantine theme of Macedonia, situated between modern Turkish Edirne and the river Nestos, in present-day Thrace. The Ottoman Empire absorbed the area in the 14th century.

There was no Ottoman province called Macedonia. The Balkans became part of province called Rumelia. In the early 19th century the name of Macedonia was almost forgotten in the modern-day area, but within the decades after the Greek independence (1830) it was revived by the Greek propaganda. In 1893 a revolutionary movement against Ottoman rule began, resulting in the Ilinden Uprising on 2 August 1903 (St. Elias's Day). The failure of the Ilinden Uprising caused a change in the strategy of the Internal Macedonian Revolutionary Organization (then Internal Macedonian-Adrianople Revolutionary Organization) from revolutionary to institutional. It split into two wings: one led by Yane Sandanski and fighting for autonomy for Macedonia and Adrianople regions inside the Ottoman Empire or inside a Balkan Federation, and a second Supremist wing supporting the inclusion of Macedonia and Southern Thrace in Bulgaria. After the Ilinden Uprising, the revolutionary movement ceased and opened a space for the Macedonian Struggle: frequent insurgencies of Bulgarian, Greek and Serbian squads into Ottoman Europe, including the ill-defined territory of the wider Macedonian region. In 1912 rivalries resulted in the First Balkan War of 1912–1913, and the Ottomans lost most of their European lands.

In 1913, the Second Balkan War began in the aftermath of the division of the Balkans among five entities to have secured control over these territories: Greece, Serbia, Bulgaria, Romania and Montenegro (all hitherto recognized). Albania, in conflict with Serbia, Montenegro and Greece, declared its independence in 1912, striving for recognition. The Treaty of London (1913) assigned the region of the future Republic of North Macedonia to Serbia. The outbreak of the First World War allowed Bulgaria to occupy eastern Macedonia and Vardar Macedonia, helping Austria-Hungary defeat the Serbs by the end of 1915, and leading to the opening of the Macedonian front against the Greek part of Macedonia. Bulgaria would maintain control over the area until their capitulation in September 1918, at which point the borders reverted (with small adjustments) to the situation of 1913, and the present-day Republic of North Macedonia became part of the Kingdom of Serbs, Croats and Slovenes. This period saw the rise of ideals of a separate Macedonian state in Greece. The Kingdom of Serbs, Croats and Slovenes changed its name in 1929 to the Kingdom of Yugoslavia and the present-day Republic of North Macedonia was included as South Serbia in a province named Vardar Banovina. During World War II, Axis forces occupied much of the Kingdom of Yugoslavia from 1941. Bulgaria as an associate of the Axis powers advanced into the territory of the Republic of North Macedonia and the Greek province of Macedonia in 1941. The territory of the Republic of North Macedonia was divided between Bulgaria and Italian Albania in June 1941.

Modern Republic of North Macedonia

The Yugoslav Communists Resistance began officially in 1941 in what is now North Macedonia. On 2 August 1944 (St. Elias's Day), honoring the fighters of the Ilinden Uprising, the Anti-fascist Assembly for the National Liberation of Macedonia (ASNOM), meeting in the Bulgarian occupation zone, proclaimed clandestinely the Macedonian state (Democratic Federal Macedonia) as a federal state within the framework of the future Yugoslav federation. In 1946 the People's Republic of Macedonia was recognized by the new communist constitution as a federal component of the newly proclaimed Federal People's Republic of Yugoslavia under the leadership of Josip Broz Tito. The issue of the republic's name immediately sparked controversy with Greece over Greek concerns that it presaged a territorial claim on the Greek coastal region of Macedonia (see Territorial concerns below). The U.S. Roosevelt administration expressed the same concern through Edward Stettinius in 1944. The Greek press and the Greek government of Andreas Papandreou continued to express the above concerns confronting the views of Yugoslavia during the 1980s and until the Revolutions of 1989.

In 1963 the People's Republic of Macedonia was renamed the "Socialist Republic of Macedonia" when the Federal People's Republic of Yugoslavia was renamed the Socialist Federal Republic of Yugoslavia. It dropped the "Socialist" from its name a few months before declaring independence from Yugoslavia in September 1991.

=== Formation of the Republic of Macedonia ===
Strong Greek opposition delayed the newly independent republic's accession to the United Nations and its recognition by the European Community (EC). Although the Arbitration Commission of the Peace Conference on the former Yugoslavia declared that the then called Republic of Macedonia met the conditions set by the EC for international recognition, Greece opposed the international community recognizing the Republic due to a number of objections concerning the country's name, flag and constitution. In an effort to block the European Community from recognizing the Republic, the Greek government persuaded the EC to adopt a common declaration establishing conditions for recognition which included a ban on "territorial claims towards a neighboring Community state, hostile propaganda and the use of a denomination that implies territorial claims".

The flag of Greek Macedonia, with the Vergina Sun

In Greece, about one million Greek Macedonians participated in the "Rally for Macedonia" (Greek: Συλλαλητήριο για τη Μακεδονία), a very large demonstration that took place in the streets of Thessaloniki in 1992. The rally aimed to object to "Macedonia" being a part of the name of then newly established Republic of Macedonia. In a following major rally in Australia, held in Melbourne and organised by the Macedonians of the Greek diaspora (which has a strong presence there), about 100,000 people protested. The major slogan of these rallies was "Macedonia is Greek" (Greek: H Μακεδονία είναι ελληνική).

Greece's major political parties agreed on 13 April 1992 not to accept the word "Macedonia" in any way in the new republic's name. This became the cornerstone of the Greek position on the issue. The Greek diaspora also mobilized in the naming controversy. A U.S. Greek group, Americans for the Just Resolution of the Macedonian Issue, placed a full-page advertisement in the 26 April and 10 May 1992 editions of the New York Times, urging President George H. W. Bush "not to discount the concerns of the Greek people" by recognizing the "Republic of Skopje" as Macedonia. Greek-Canadians mounted a similar campaign. The EC subsequently issued a declaration expressing a willingness "to recognize that republic within its existing borders ... under a name which does not include the term Macedonia".

Greek objections likewise held up the wider international recognition of the then Republic of Macedonia. Although the Republic applied for membership of the United Nations on 30 July 1992, its application languished in diplomatic limbo for nearly a year. A few states—Bulgaria, Turkey, Slovenia, Croatia, Belarus, and Lithuania—recognized the republic under its constitutional name before its admission to the United Nations. Most, however, waited to see what the United Nations would do. The delay had a serious effect on the Republic, as it led to a worsening of its already precarious economic and political conditions. With war raging in nearby Bosnia and Herzegovina and in Croatia, the need to ensure the country's stability became an urgent priority for the international community. The deteriorating security situation led to the UN's first-ever preventative peacekeeping deployment in December 1992, when units of the United Nations Protection Force deployed to monitor possible border violations from Serbia.

=== Compromise solutions ===
Map of Socialist Republic of Yugoslavia

During 1992, the International Monetary Fund, World Bank and the International Conference on the Former Yugoslavia all adopted the appellation "the former Yugoslav Republic of Macedonia" to refer to the Republic in their discussions and dealings with it. The same terminology was proposed in January 1993 by France, Spain and the United Kingdom, the three EC members of the United Nations Security Council, to enable the Republic to join the United Nations. The proposal was circulated on 22 January 1993 by the United Nations Secretary General. However, it was initially rejected by both sides in the dispute. It was immediately opposed by the Greek Foreign Minister, Michalis Papakonstantinou. In a letter to the Secretary General dated 25 January 1993, he argued that admitting the republic "prior to meeting the necessary prerequisites, and in particular abandoning the use of the denomination 'Republic of Macedonia', would perpetuate and increase friction and tension and would not be conducive to peace and stability in an already troubled region."

The president of the Republic of Macedonia, Kiro Gligorov, also opposed the proposed formula. In a letter of 24 March 1993, he informed the President of the United Nations Security Council that "the Republic of Macedonia will in no circumstances be prepared to accept 'the former Yugoslav Republic of Macedonia' as the name of the country." He declared that "we refuse to be associated in any way with the present connotation of the term 'Yugoslavia'". The issue of possible Serbian territorial ambitions had been a long-running concern in the Republic of Macedonia, which some Serbian nationalists still called "South Serbia" after its pre-World War II name. The government in the Republic of Macedonia was consequently nervous of any naming formula which might be seen to endorse a possible Serbian territorial claim.

Both sides came under intense diplomatic pressure to compromise. The support that Greece had received initially from its allies and partners in NATO and the European Community had begun to wane due to a combination of factors that included irritation in some quarters at Greece's hard line on the issue and a belief that Greece had flouted sanctions against Slobodan Milošević's Federal Republic of Yugoslavia. The intra-Community tensions were publicly exposed on 20 January 1993 by the Danish foreign minister, Uffe Ellemann-Jensen, who attracted the ire of Greek members of the European Parliament when he described the Greek position as "ridiculous" and expressed the hope that "the Security Council will very quickly recognise Macedonia and that many of the member states of the Community will support this."

The Greek Prime Minister, Konstantinos Mitsotakis, took a much more moderate line on the issue than many of his colleagues in the governing New Democracy party. Despite opposition from hardliners, he endorsed the proposal in March 1993. The acceptance of the formula by Athens also led to the reluctant acquiescence of the government in Skopje, though it too was divided between moderates and hardliners on the issue.

On 7 April 1993, the UN Security Council endorsed the admission of the republic in United Nations Security Council Resolution 817. It recommended to the United Nations General Assembly "that the State whose application is contained in document S/25147 be admitted to membership in the United Nations, this State being provisionally referred to for all purposes within the United Nations as 'the former Yugoslav Republic of Macedonia' pending settlement of the difference that has arisen over the name of the State." The recommendation was agreed by the General Assembly, which passed Resolution 225 on the following day, 8 April, using virtually the same language as the Security Council. The Republic of Macedonia thus became the 181st member of the United Nations.

The compromise solution, as set out in the two resolutions, was very carefully worded in an effort to meet the objections and concerns of both sides. The wording of the resolutions rested on four key principles:

- The appellation "[F]ormer Yugoslav Republic of Macedonia" is a provisional term to be used only until the dispute was resolved.
- The term was a reference, not a name; as a neutral party in the dispute, the United Nations had not sought to determine the name of the state. The President of the Security Council subsequently issued a statement declaring on behalf of the Council that the term "merely reflected the historic fact that it had been in the past a republic of the former Socialist Federal Republic of Yugoslavia". The purpose of the term was also emphasised by the fact that the expression begins with the uncapitalised words "the former Yugoslav", acting as a descriptive term, rather than "the Former Yugoslav", which would act as a proper noun. By also being a reference rather than a name, it met Greek concerns that the term "Macedonia" should not be used in the republic's internationally recognised name.
- The use of the term was purely "for all purposes within the United Nations"; it was not being mandated for any other party.
- The term did not imply that the Republic of Macedonia had any connection with the existing Federal Republic of Yugoslavia, as opposed to the historical and now-defunct Socialist Federal Republic of Yugoslavia.

One additional concern that had to be taken care of was the seating of the Republic of Macedonia in the General Assembly. Greece rejected seating the Republic's representative under M [as in "Macedonia (former Yugoslav Republic of)"], and the Republic rejected sitting under F (as in "Former Yugoslav Republic of Macedonia", which turned the reference into a proper noun rather than a description). Instead, it was seated under T as "the former Yugoslav Republic of Macedonia" and placed next to Thailand.

In due course, the same convention was adopted by many other international organisations and states but they did so independently, not as the result of being instructed by the UN. For its part, Greece did not adopt the UN terminology at this stage and did not recognise the Republic under any name. The rest of the international community did not immediately recognise the Republic, but this did eventually happen at the end of 1993 and start of 1994. The People's Republic of China was the first major power to act, recognising the Republic under its constitutional name on 13 October 1993. On 16 December 1993, two weeks before Greece was due to take up the European Union presidency, six key EC countries—Denmark, France, Germany, Italy, the Netherlands and the United Kingdom—recognised the Republic under its UN designation. Other EC countries followed suit in quick succession and by the end of December, all EC member states except Greece had recognised the Republic. Japan, Russia and the United States followed suit on 21 December 1993, 3 February 1994, and 9 February 1994 respectively.

=== Continuing dispute ===
Despite the apparent success of the compromise agreement, it led to an upsurge in nationalist agitation in both countries. Anti-Western and anti-American feelings came to the fore in Greece, in response to a perception that Greece's partners in the EC and NATO had betrayed it. The government of Constantine Mitsotakis was highly vulnerable; it had a majority of only a couple of seats and was under considerable pressure from ultra-nationalists. After the country's admission to the UN, the hardline former foreign minister Antonis Samaras broke away from the governing New Democracy (ND) party along with three like-minded deputies who resented what they saw as the prime minister's unacceptable weakness on the Macedonian issue. This defection deprived ND of its slim parliamentary majority and ultimately caused the fall of the government, which suffered a landslide defeat in the general election of October 1993. It was replaced by the PASOK party under Andreas Papandreou, who introduced an even more hardline policy on Macedonia and withdrew from the UN-sponsored negotiations on the naming issue in late October.

The government of the Republic of Macedonia also faced domestic opposition for its part in the agreement. Protest rallies against the UN's temporary reference were held in the cities of Skopje, Kočani and Resen. The parliament only accepted the agreement by a narrow margin, with 30 deputies voting in favour, 28 voting against and 13 abstaining. The nationalist VMRO-DPMNE party (then in opposition) called a vote of no confidence over the naming issue, but the government survived with 62 deputies voting in its favour.

The naming dispute has not been confined to the Balkans, as immigrant communities from both countries have actively defended the positions of their respective homelands around the world, organising large protest rallies in major European, North American and Australian cities. After Australia recognised the "former Yugoslav Republic of Macedonia" in early 1994, tensions between the two communities reached a climax, with churches and properties hit by a series of tit-for-tat bomb and arson attacks in Melbourne.

=== Greek embargo ===
The relations between the two countries further worsened in February 1994 when Greece imposed a trade embargo on Macedonia which coincided with the UN embargo on Federal Republic of Yugoslavia on its northern border. The combined blockade denied Macedonia access to its closest and most accessible sea port, Thessaloniki, and rendered its main north-south trade route useless. The country was forced to supply itself through the undeveloped east-west route. During the embargo oil was imported to Macedonia via the Bulgarian port of Varna, which is located over 700 km from Skopje, on tank trucks using a mountain road. It has been estimated that Macedonia suffered damages of around US$2 billion due to the trade embargo. Greece received heavy international criticism; the embargo lasted for 18 months, and was lifted after the interim accord between the two countries was signed in October 1995.

=== Interim accord ===
The flag used by the Socialist Republic of Macedonia from 1963 to 1991 with the red star on the canton. It was also used by the Republic of Macedonia from 1991 to 1992 and the People's Republic of Macedonia from 1946 to 1963.

The flag used by the Republic of Macedonia from 1992 to 1995. The newly established state's adoption of the symbol was considered by Greece to be a provocation.

The current flag of the Republic, adopted on 5 October 1995

Greece and the Republic of Macedonia eventually formalised bilateral relations in an interim accord signed in New York on 13 September 1995. Under the agreement, the Republic removed the Vergina Sun from its flag and allegedly irredentist clauses from its constitution, and both countries committed to continuing negotiations on the naming issue under UN auspices. For its part, Greece agreed that it would not object to any application by the Republic so long as it used only the appellation set out in "paragraph 2 of the United Nations Security Council resolution 817" (i.e. "former Yugoslav Republic of Macedonia"). This opened the door for the Republic to join a variety of international organisations and initiatives, including the Council of Europe, the Organization for Security and Co-operation in Europe (OSCE) and Partnership for Peace.

The accord was not a conventional perpetual treaty, as it can be superseded or revoked, but its provisions are legally binding in terms of international law. Most unusually, it did not use the names of either party. Greece, "the Party of the First Part", recognised the Republic of Macedonia under the term "the Party of the Second Part". The accord did not specifically identify either party by name (thus avoiding the awkwardness of Greece having to use the term "Macedonia" in reference to its northern neighbour). Instead, it identified the two parties elliptically by describing the Party of the First Part as having Athens as its capital and the Party of the Second Part having its capital at Skopje. Subsequent declarations have continued this practice of referring to the parties without naming them.

Cyrus Vance was the witness of Interim Accord as Special Envoy of the Secretary-General of the United Nations.

== Stalemate ==
List of countries/entities that used "Republic of Macedonia" in bilateral diplomatic relations. that used "the former Yugoslav Republic of Macedonia" for all official purposes. whose official position on the issue was unknown. that have no diplomatic relations with the country

The naming issue was effectively at a stalemate until the 2018 agreement. Various names had been proposed over the years, for instance "Vardar Macedonia", "North Macedonia", "New Macedonia", "Upper Macedonia", "Slavo-Macedonia", "Nova Makedonija", "Macedonia (Skopje)" and so on. However, these had invariably fallen foul of the initial Greek position that no permanent formula incorporating the term "Macedonia" was acceptable. Athens had counter-proposed the names "Vardar Republic" or "Republic of Skopje", but the government and opposition parties in Skopje had consistently rejected any solution that eliminated the term "Macedonia" from the country's name. Following these developments, Greece has gradually revised its position and demonstrated its acceptance of a composite appellation, with a geographical qualifier, erga omnes (i.e. the incorporation of the term "Macedonia" in the name, but with the use of a disambiguating name specification, for international and intergovernmental use). (Note: See:) The inhabitants of the Republic were overwhelmingly opposed to changing the country's name. A June 2007 opinion poll found that 77% of the population were against a change in the country's constitutional name, and 72% supported the Republic's accession to NATO only if it was admitted under its constitutional name. Only 8% supported accession under the reference "the former Yugoslav Republic of Macedonia".

A number of states recognized the Republic of Macedonia by its constitutional name. A few had recognised it by this name from the start, while most others had switched from recognising it under its UN reference. By September 2007, 118 countries (61% of all UN member states) had recognised the Republic of Macedonia under its constitutional name, including the likes of the United States, Russia and China. Some observers had suggested that the gradual revision of the Greek position means that "the question appears destined to die" in due course. On the other hand, attempts by the Republic to persuade international organisations to drop the provisional reference have met with limited success. A recent example was the rejection by the Parliamentary Assembly of the Council of Europe of a draft proposal to replace the provisional reference with the constitutional name in Council of Europe documents.

The compromise reference is always used in relations when states not recognising the constitutional name are present. This is because the UN refers to the country only as "the former Yugoslav Republic of Macedonia". Moscow's ambassador to Athens, Andrei Vdovin, stated that Russia will support whichever solution stems from the UN compromise talks, while hinting that "it is some other countries that seem to have a problem in doing so".

Most Greeks reject the use of the word "Macedonia" to describe the Republic of Macedonia, instead calling it "ΠΓΔΜ" (Πρώην Γιουγκοσλαβική Δημοκρατία της Μακεδονίας, the Greek translation of "FYROM"), or Skopje, after the country's capital. The latter metonymic name is not used by non-Greeks, and many inhabitants of the Republic regard it as insulting. Greeks also call the country's inhabitants Skopians (Greek: Σκοπιανοί), a derogatory term. Greek official sources sometimes also use the term "Slavomacedonian"; the U.S. Department of State has used the term side by side with "Macedonian" in context of the ethnic Macedonian minority in Greek Macedonia and their inability to self-determine as Macedonians due to pressure by the Greek government. Both terms were used by the U.S. Department of State in quotation marks to reflect nomenclature being used in Greek Macedonia. The name "Macedonian Slavs" (Македонски Словени) is another term used to refer to the ethnic Macedonians, though this term can be viewed as derogatory by ethnic Macedonians, including those in Greek Macedonia. The name had been occasionally used in early ethnic Macedonian literary sources as in Krste Misirkov's work On Macedonian Matters (Za Makedonckite Raboti) in 1903.

Although the two countries continued to argue over the name, in practice they dealt pragmatically with each other. Economic relations and cooperation resumed to such an extent that, as of 2006, Greece was considered one of the Republic's most important foreign economic partners and investors.

=== 2005–2006 proposals and the "double name formula" ===
In 2005, Matthew Nimetz, UN Special Representative, suggested using "Republika Makedonija-Skopje" for official purposes. Greece did not accept the proposal outright, but characterised it as "a basis for constructive negotiations". Prime Minister Vlado Bučkovski rejected the proposal and counterproposed a "double name formula" where the international community uses "Republic of Macedonia" and Greece uses "former Yugoslav Republic of Macedonia".

Nimetz was reported to have made a new proposal in October 2005; that the name "Republika Makedonija" should be used by those countries that have recognised the country under that name and that Greece should use the formula "Republika Makedonija – Skopje", while the international institutions and organisations should use the name "Republika Makedonia" in Latin alphabet transcription. Although the government of the Republic of Macedonia accepted the proposal as a good basis for solving the dispute, Greece rejected the proposal as unacceptable.

In December 2006, the newly-elected nationalist VMRO-DPMNE-led government of the Republic announced the intent to rename Skopje Airport "Petrovec" to "Aleksandar Veliki" (Alexander the Great). Matthew Nimetz was invited to Athens in January 2007, where he commented that the efforts to mediate in the issue over the name were "affected and not in a positive way".

=== NATO and EU accession talks ===
The Republic of Macedonia's aspirations to join the European Union and NATO under its constitutional name caused controversy in recent years. Under the Interim Accord of September 1995, Greece agreed not to obstruct the Republic's applications for membership in international bodies as long as it did so under its provisional UN appellation. Leading Greek officials had repeatedly stated that Athens would veto the country's accession in the absence of a resolution to the dispute. The Greek foreign minister, Dora Bakoyannis, stated that "the Hellenic Parliament, under any composition, will not ratify the accession of the neighbouring country to the EU and NATO if the name issue is not resolved beforehand."

The Greek Prime Minister Kostas Karamanlis had initially denied ever committing himself unequivocally to exercising Greece's right of veto, stating instead that he would only block the neighbouring country's application for EU and NATO membership if it sought to be admitted as the "Republic of Macedonia", but on 19 October 2007, he stated that without a mutually acceptable solution to the name issue, the country could not join either NATO or the EU.

Negotiations between Athens and Skopje were resumed on the 1 November 2007, continued on 1 December of the same year, and a bilateral meeting was held in January 2008. On 19 February 2008 in Athens, the delegations of the two countries met under the auspices of the UN mediator, Matthew Nimetz. They were presented with a new framework, which they both accepted as a basis for further negotiations. The new framework was intended to be secret so that negotiations could take place, but was leaked early in the press. The full text in Greek was published initially by To Vima and circulated speedily in all major media. It contained 8 points, and the general idea was a "composite name solution" for all international purposes. It also contained five proposed names:

- "Constitutional Republic of Macedonia"
- "Democratic Republic of Macedonia"
- "Independent Republic of Macedonia"
- "New Republic of Macedonia"
- "Republic of Upper Macedonia"

On 27 February 2008, a rally was held in Skopje called by several organisations in support of the name "Republic of Macedonia". Greek nationalist party Popular Orthodox Rally also organised a similar rally in Thessaloniki on 5 March, in support of the name "Macedonia" being used only by Greece. The Greek church and both major Greek parties strongly discouraged such protests "during this sensitive time of negotiation".

On 2 March 2008, in New York, Matthew Nimetz announced that the talks had failed, that there was a "gap" in the positions of the two countries, and that there would not be any progress, unless there were some sort of compromise, which he characterised as "valuable" for both sides. After Greek PM Karamanlis's warnings that "no solution equals no invitation", the Greek media took it for granted that Greece would veto the coming NATO accession talks for the country, in the Foreign Ministers' summit on 6 March 2008 in Brussels.

Meanwhile, in a newer poll in Greece, the "composite name that includes the name Macedonia for the country" seemed, for the first time, to be marginally more popular than the previous more hard-lined stance of "no Macedonia in the title" (43% vs 42%). In the same poll, 84% of the respondents were pro-veto in the country's NATO accession talks, if the issue had not been resolved by then. All Greek political parties except the small nationalist party Popular Orthodox Rally support the "composite name for all uses" solution, and are vehemently opposed to any "double name" formula which is proposed by the republic. This shift in the official and public position was described by the PM of Greece as "the maximum recoil possible".

Following his visit to Athens in an attempt to persuade the Greek government not to proceed to a veto, the NATO Secretary General Jaap de Hoop Scheffer implied that the onus to compromise rested on the Republic of Macedonia. In the same spirit, the EU's Enlargement Commissioner Olli Rehn, expressed his fear that "it might have negative consequences on FYROM's EU bid, although it is a bilateral question, Greece—as any other EU member—has the right to veto". On 5 March 2008, Nimetz visited Skopje to try to find common ground on his proposal, but announced that "the gap remains".

As earlier anticipated, on 6 March 2008, in the NATO Foreign Minister's summit in Brussels, Greek minister Dora Bakoyannis announced that "as regards the former Yugoslav Republic of Macedonia, ... , unfortunately, the policy followed by our neighbouring country in its relations with Greece, on the one side with intransigence and on the other with a logic of nationalist and irredentist actions tightly connected with the naming issue, does not allow us to maintain a positive stance, as we did for Croatia and Albania. ... As long as there is no such solution, Greece will remain an insuperable obstacle to the European and Euro-Atlantic ambition of FYROM".

On 7 March 2008, the U.S. Assistant Secretary of State for European and Eurasian Affairs, Daniel Fried, made an unscheduled visit to Skopje, with the message that the two sides must cooperate with Matthew Nimetz to find a mutually acceptable solution for the naming dispute.

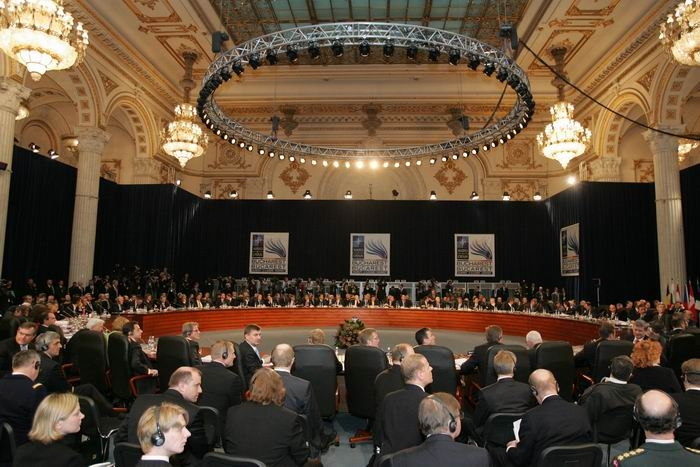
The 2008 Bucharest summit of NATO

Concerns were expressed in Skopje and Athens on the stability of the governing coalition of VMRO-DPMNE and Democratic Party of Albanians (DPA) and subsequently the negotiating power of PM Nikola Gruevski with regards to the naming dispute, after the leader of DPA Menduh Thaçi accused the government of not complying with its requests about the rights of Albanians in the Republic of Macedonia. Greek media considered the option that the crisis might be a diplomatic way of increasing the pressure on the Greek side. Following a call for cooperation by the president Branko Crvenkovski, the other four major parties agreed to support Gruevski's government until NATO's convention in Bucharest on 4 April 2008.

The possibility of a failure of the ascension talks was met with unease by the ethnic Albanian part of the population that places more importance on EU and NATO membership than on the Macedonia name issue.

Following the declaration of Athens for a veto, the press in Skopje reported increased intervention from the United States to solve the dispute, through Victoria Nuland, the U.S. NATO ambassador. Antonio Milošoski announced that "Nimetz's proposal remains unchanged". The daily newspaper Dnevnik reported that diplomatic sources claimed that this would be the last attempt from the American leadership to help in finding a solution, and that the target of this effort would be for the country to retreat from its position in regard to a "double name formula" and for Greece to accept something along these lines. It continued by saying that the U.S. would exercise pressure on both sides to find a solution before NATO's summit, so that the alliance could be expanded. Olli Rehn urged "the former Yugoslav Republic of Macedonia to show the correct political will in seizing the opportunity to find an acceptable solution for both parts".

A new meeting between Nimetz and the two parties was arranged on 17 March 2008 in Vienna, in the office of the former UN special envoy to Kosovo and ex-president of Finland, Martti Ahtisaari. Nimetz noted that he did not present any new proposals, thanked the United States with whom he said he was in contact, and urged more countries to help in solving the dispute. He also announced that he was more optimistic after this meeting, and that he focused only on the solutions that could be applied by NATO's summit in April.

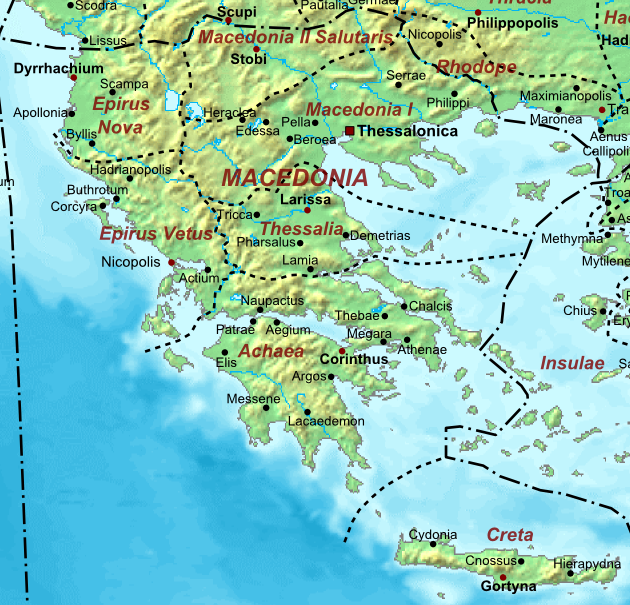
Map of the Roman Province of Macedonia showing its division into 'Macedonia Prima' and 'Macedonia Secundus' or 'Salutaris'

According to the press in the Republic of Macedonia Nimetz now limited his proposal to three names of the five that were proposed in his original framework:

- "Republic of Upper Macedonia"
- "New Republic of Macedonia" or "Republic of New Macedonia"
- "Republic of Macedonia-Skopje"

Of the three, Greek media reported that the only serious contender was "New Macedonia", which was the solution favoured at the time throughout the round of negotiations by Washington, which regarded it as the "most neutral" option. According to some reports, all three proposals were swiftly rejected by Skopje on the grounds that "neither would constitute a logical basis for a solution, given that all had been rejected by one or the other side over the last 15 years". Greek diplomatic sources intimated that international pressure had now shifted towards the former Yugoslav republic.

A special meeting outside the auspices of the UN was arranged on 21 March 2008, at U.S. ambassador's to NATO Victoria Nuland's house in Brussels, between the two foreign ministers Dora Bakoyannis and Antonio Milošoski and with the presence of the U.S. Assistant Secretary of State for European and Eurasian Affairs, Daniel Fried. Following the meeting, both ministers stressed for the first time their "commitment" for finding a solution before NATO's summit.

In 2011, the first voices seeking compromise started to be heard in Skopje. The president of the republic, Branko Crvenkovski, announced: "If during the ongoing talks we can reach a rational compromise, which from the one side will defend our ethnic identity, and from the other will enable us to receive the NATO invitation, while at the same time canceling our further EU accession obstacles, then I think that this is something that must be supported, and I personally side with the supporters. Some accuse me that with my stance I am undermining the negotiating position of the Republic of Macedonia, yet I do not agree, because we are not in the beginning, but in the final phase of the negotiations. The one who will tell me that the price is high, is obliged to address the public opinion and announce an alternative scenario on how Macedonia will develop in the next ten to fifteen years."

In the same spirit, opposing New Social Democratic Party party leader Tito Petkovski (which by now was participating in the governmental coalition until NATO's summit), announced: "I do not hide that we must proceed on an international usage name's change, with some type of addition, which in no way must put our values under question. I do not want to proceed in an auction with the name, because that will be very damaging also for the interests of the neighboring country that disputes it." He added that "the overwhelming majority of the state and the scholars, ask for a solution and for a way out, using something that does not put our identity and our cultural distinction under questioning. I think that such a solution can be found, especially if the greatest lobbyists and supporters of ours, the United States, declare that Macedonia will be safe, with a safe territorial integrity, with financial support and dynamic development. If we declare which name we support, probably there will be more terms".

However, governing VMRO-DPMNE party leader and prime minister at the time, Nikola Gruevski, when asked to comment on these statements, said: "We have different views from Mr. Petkovski, however there is still time to overcome these differences and reach a solution which will benefit the country".

Centre-left Greek newspaper To Vima reported that the two countries were close to an agreement on the basis of the name "New Macedonia" or the untranslated native form, "Nova Makedonija".

Another meeting under the auspices of UN mediator Matthew Nimetz was held in New York on 25 March 2008. Nimetz announced his final proposal, with a name "with a geographic dimension, and for all purposes". He also noted that the proposal was a compromise, and that the ways of implementation were also included in his proposal. The two representatives would urgently return to their countries for consultation on this proposal, given the short timeframe until NATO's summit. According to Greek media reports at the time, Nimetz revived his 2005 proposal, "Republic of Macedonia-Skopje". The news agency for Macedonian private television station A1 reported that the full proposal was:

- The constitutional name, in Cyrillic ("Република Македонија") could be used for internal purposes.
- "Republic of Macedonia (Skopje)" would be used for international relations.
- For bilateral relations, "Republic of Macedonia (Skopje)" is suggested, and any countries using the state's constitutional name would be encouraged to use it, but not forced to change it.
- The terms "Macedonia" and "Macedonian", on their own, would be able to be used freely by both countries

The Macedonian government did not issue a statement on whether the proposal has been accepted or rejected.

Greek foreign minister Dora Bakoyannis told journalists that the proposal does not meet Greece's stated objectives.

The Macedonian foreign minister, Antonio Milošoski, stated that any reasonable solution that did not impose on the identity of ethnic Macedonians would be explored. However, he also stated that if Greece were to veto the country's entrance into NATO, compromise talks would be stopped.

Meanwhile, police in Skopje said they were investigating death threats against academics, journalists and politicians who publicly favoured reaching a compromise in the dispute with Greece.

=== NATO non-invitation ===
On 3 April 2008, at NATO's summit in Bucharest, Greece presented its case on the non-invitation of the republic. NATO secretary general Jaap de Hoop Scheffer announced the mutually agreed text of the NATO members, which included the following points:

- Reason for no invitation was the inability to find solution in the name dispute
- Open invitation to the government of Skopje for new negotiations for the name under the auspices of the United Nations,
- The wish that those negotiations start as soon as possible,
- And the further wish that they are concluded as soon as possible, without mentioning a specific time frame.

A major concern cited by Greek officials was a number of maps that have circulated by nationalist groups based in Skopje depicting parts of Greece (including Thessaloniki, Greece's second largest city) as being part of a future United Macedonia, and the country's prime minister photographed laying a wreath under such a map just a few weeks before the summit. Also a poster displayed in Skopje just days before the Bucharest summit by an artist replacing the white cross on the Greek flag with the swastika, as a way of comparing modern Greece to Nazi Germany and caricatures of Greek PM Karamanlis depicted wearing a Nazi SS uniform led to vigorous Greek diplomatic protests and international condemnation although the government disassociated itself from the depictions and expressed it has no connection and no authority over artists' works.

According to Greek media reports, the Greek position was strongly supported by France and Spain. Italy, Portugal, Luxembourg, Iceland, Belgium, Hungary, Slovakia, and the Netherlands also showed understanding to the Greek concerns. The U.S. proposal for inviting the country under its UN provisional reference (FYROM) was backed by Turkey, Slovenia, the Czech Republic, Estonia, Lithuania, Denmark, Bulgaria, and Norway; Germany, the United Kingdom, and Canada were reported neutral.

According to polls, 95% of Greeks believed the veto appropriate, while only 1% opposed it. Then Foreign Affairs Minister Dora Bakoyannis stated that her country would continue to focus on promoting its neighbour's NATO and EU accession as soon as the naming issue is resolved.

=== "Antiquisation" policy, 2006–2017 ===
Since coming to power in 2006, and especially since the Republic of Macedonia's non-invitation to NATO in 2008, the nationalist VMRO-DPMNE government pursued a policy of "Antiquisation" ("Antikvizatzija") as a way of putting pressure on Greece and for domestic identity-building. Antiquisation was also spreading due to intensive lobbying by the Macedonian diaspora from the U.S., Canada, Germany and Australia. As part of this policy, stations and airports were renamed after Ancient Macedonian figures, and statues of Alexander the Great and Philip II of Macedon were built in several cities across the country.

In 2011, a massive, 22 m tall statue of Alexander the Great (called "Warrior on Horseback" because of the dispute with Greece) was inaugurated in Macedonia Square in Skopje, as part of the Skopje 2014 remodelling of the city. An even larger statue of Philip II was under construction at the other end of the square. Statues of Alexander also adorn the town squares of Prilep and Štip, while a statue to Philip II of Macedon was built in Bitola. A triumphal arch named Porta Macedonia, constructed in the same square, features images of historical figures including Alexander the Great, causing the Greek Foreign Ministry to lodge an official complaint to authorities in the Republic of Macedonia. Additionally, many pieces of public infrastructure, such as airports, highways, and stadiums, were named after them.

Skopje's airport was renamed "Alexander the Great Airport" and antique objects were moved there from Skopje's archeological museum. One of Skopje's main squares was renamed Pella Square (after Pella, the capital of the ancient kingdom of Macedon, which falls within modern Greece), while the main highway to Greece was renamed to "Alexander of Macedon" and Skopje's largest stadium was renamed "Philip II Arena". These actions were seen as deliberate provocations in neighboring Greece, exacerbating the dispute and further stalling Macedonia's EU and NATO applications.

Antiquisation faced criticism by academics as it demonstrated feebleness of archaeology and of other historical disciplines in public discourse, as well as a danger of marginalization. The policy also attracted criticism domestically, by ethnic Macedonians within the country, who saw it as dangerously dividing the country between those who identify with classical antiquity and those who identify with the country's Slavic culture. Ethnic Albanians in the Republic of Macedonia saw it as an attempt to marginalise them and exclude them from the national narrative. Foreign diplomats warned that the policy reduced international sympathy for the Republic of Macedonia in the naming dispute with Greece.

=== A continuing negotiation ===
The Assembly of the Republic of Macedonia voted on 11 April 2008 to dissolve itself and hold early elections within sixty days. Following a meeting with the four major parties, president Branko Crvenkovski announced the continuation of the negotiations for the name, despite the parliament dissolution. The parties agreed that the dispute should not be a matter of heavy political debate before the elections.

Matthew Nimetz visited Skopje on 17 April 2008 and Athens on the following day, initiating a new cycle of negotiations, but without bearing a new proposal yet.

Talks continued in New York from 30 April to 2 May 2008, though Nimetz again did not propose a new compromise name.

=== 2008 proposal and reactions ===
According to media from both sides, the main points of the proposal from 8 October 2008 were the following:

- the name "Republic of Macedonia" will stay the official name inside the country (in the native language)
- the name for the country in all official purposes (i.e. United Nations, EU, NATO) will be "Republic of North Macedonia" (Macedonian: Република Северна Македонија)
- UN Security Council will suggest to third countries to use the name "Republic of North Macedonia" in official bilateral relations
- the name "former Yugoslav Republic of Macedonia" will no longer be an acceptable name for the country
- "Macedonia" alone cannot be used by any of the two parties as an official name for the country or the region.
- Both parties can use "Macedonia" and "Macedonian" in unofficial settings, with the precondition that they will not claim exclusive rights of any kind.
- the front page of the North Macedonian passports will contain the following names for the country:
  - Republic of North Macedonia in English
  - République de Macédoine du Nord in French
  - Република Македонија in Macedonian
- Greece will support the integration of its neighbouring country into EU and NATO
- both countries will confirm that they have no territorial claims towards each other

==== Reaction by ethnic Macedonian politicians/diplomats ====
The cabinet of the President of the Republic of Macedonia, Branko Crvenkovski, announced that the Republic of Macedonia wanted "serious changes" in the latest proposal and that the presented set of ideas could not be a basis for the resolution of the dispute. Prime minister Nikola Gruevski agreed with Crvenkovski.

==== Reaction by Greek politicians/diplomats ====
The English edition of the Greek newspaper Kathimerini reported that Greek diplomats privately welcomed the proposals. Greek Foreign Minister Dora Bakoyannis, however, did not make a comment on the newest set of proposals. It was also said that Athens would not state its position before Skopje. In the meantime, all major opposition parties expressed serious concerns about the proposal since it crossed the "red line" that Greece had set on a single name to be used erga omnes.

Before either Athens or Skopje had officially responded to the proposal, the Athenian daily Ethnos published an alleged secret diplomatic correspondence of the U.S. Department of State. The leaked document, originally tagged as classified until 2018, was said to detail a behind-the-scenes deal between Washington and Skopje on the main provisions of the Nimetz proposal as early as July. According to the newspaper, the latest UN-sponsored set of ideas were secretly sketched to please Skopje by the U.S. Secretary of State Condoleezza Rice three months earlier. The report sparked outrage in Greece, with opposition parties accusing the government of tolerating "US interference" in the UN mediation process and calling for Greece's withdrawal from the negotiations. Skopje "strongly and categorically" denied all claims of the existence of a secret deal with Washington.

==== Reaction by Bulgarian politicians/diplomats ====
Bulgarian Prime Minister Boyko Borisov, stated in June 2012 that names like "Northern Macedonia" would be completely unacceptable, since this geographical term would include Bulgarian territories, and more specifically the region of Blagoevgrad, giving rise to irredentist territorial claims by nationalist ethnic Macedonians against Bulgaria.

=== The International Court of Justice ===
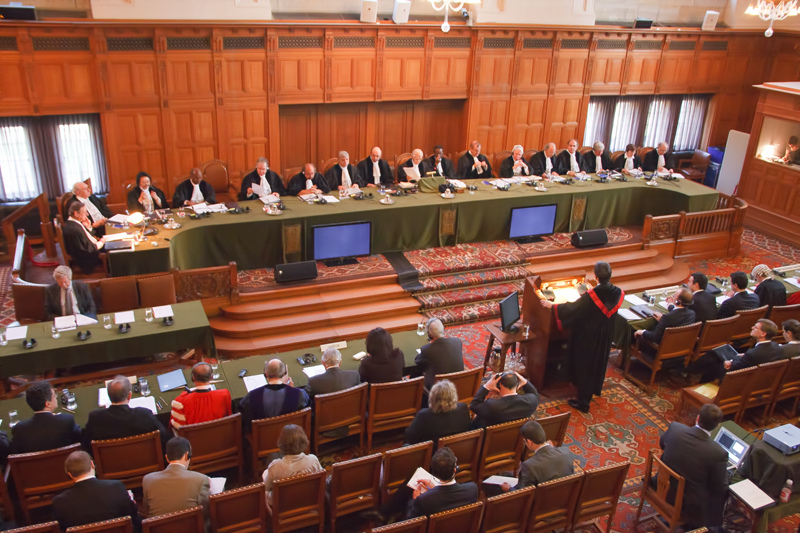
International Court of Justice hearing in the case of "Application of the Interim Accord of 13 September 1995 (the former Yugoslav Republic of Macedonia v. Greece)"

In November 2008, Republic of Macedonia instituted proceedings against the Hellenic Republic in front of the UN's International Court of Justice for what it described as "a flagrant violation of [Greece's] obligations under Article 11 of the Interim Accord signed by the Parties on 13 September 1995". The alleged violation was referring to the blockade by Athens to Macedonia's bid for NATO membership.

Following the submissions of memorials and counter-memorials, and the public hearings, the legal positions of the parties were as follows:

Republic of Macedonia requested that:

1. Greek objections to the jurisdiction of the Court should be rejected,
2. The Court should adjudge and declare that Greece has violated the obligations under the provisions of the Interim Accord, Article 11, paragraph 1, and
3. The Court to order Greece to immediately take all necessary steps to comply with the obligations under the above provisions, and to refrain from objecting in any way, directly or indirectly, to the membership of the Republic of Macedonia in NATO and/or any other "international, multilateral and regional organizations and institutions" if the Republic of Macedonia applies for such membership under the name "Former Yugoslav Republic of Macedonia".

The Hellenic Republic requested that the Court:

1. Should find that the case does not fall within the jurisdiction of the Court and to reject it as inadmissible;
2. In the event that the Court finds that it has jurisdiction over the case submitted by the Applicant, then to find those claims as unfounded.

The Court delivered its judgement on 5 December 2011. In its judgment, which was final, without possibility for appeal, and binding on the parties, the ICJ found that:

1. it had jurisdiction to process this case;
2. the Hellenic Republic, by objecting to the admission of the former Yugoslav Republic of Macedonia to NATO, had breached its obligation under Article 11, paragraph 1, of the Interim Accord of 13 September 1995;
3. rejected all other submissions made by the former Yugoslav Republic of Macedonia.

The ICJ decision was welcomed by the Macedonian foreign minister Nikola Poposki, who stated that Macedonia remained "strongly committed to finding a lasting, mutually acceptable solution to the difference with Greece over the name". On the other hand, the response of the Ministry for foreign affairs of Greece was that they were reviewing the decision and that "Greece will continue to pursue negotiations in good faith to reach a mutually acceptable solution on the name of the former Yugoslav Republic of Macedonia". The court however did not grant Macedonia's request that it instruct Greece to refrain from similar actions in the future, nor was there a change in the EU's stance that Macedonia's accession negotiations could not begin until the name issue was resolved.

==== Political reactions to the Application in the ICJ ====
- Greece issued a statement condemning its northern neighbor for "confirming that it is not interested in a solution", adding that "the former Yugoslav Republic of Macedonia has itself flagrantly violated a series of fundamental obligations expressly foreseen by the Accord, including the fundamental principle of good neighbourly relations."
- The prime minister of the Republic of Macedonia Nikola Gruevski announced on 25 November 2008 that the "name negotiations will resume despite Macedonia's lawsuit against Greece". The EU did not comment on the latest development.
- Reinforcing the Greek position that in the summit of Bucharest there was no veto, on 21 November in a conference in Skopje, the Czech representative in NATO Štefan Füle reiterated that there had not been a veto from Greece but that there was not a consensus on invitation.
- The Gruevski government's decision to pursue legal action against Athens was criticised by then-president Branko Crvenkovski, highlighting the internal tensions in Skopje between the government and the presidency. Noting that the process could take years, the president called it a "waste of valuable time", given that there was no way for the International Court to enforce any verdict in Skopje's favour.

=== Talks in 2009 ===
The first round of name talks in 2009 took place on 11 February. The UN Mediator Nimetz did not propose a new solution for the name row, but it was agreed that talks should continue after elections in Greece and the Republic of Macedonia, probably in July or August. Republic of Macedonia's new name negotiator Zoran Jolevski told the mediator and the Greek negotiator that if the Republic of Macedonia would receive a NATO membership invitation at the Alliance's next summit in April, this would be positive for the name talks. One week before the fresh name talks, Macedonian foreign minister Antonio Milošoski told German newspaper Die Tageszeitung that a solution could be found "only on bilateral basis". The Republic of Macedonia indicated it could be ready to allow Greece to use another name for the country, such as "Republic of Macedonia (Skopje)", however, its citizens would decide on a referendum for that. In addition, foreign minister Antonio Milošoski sent a letter to the Greek foreign ministry with a proposal of forming a joint committee of scholars from both countries who would work on determining the historical facts of the dispute, but this was promptly dismissed by Athens.

==== CSIS Conference ====
On 14 April 2009, at the Center for Strategic and International Studies Conference on the topic of Completing America's Mission in the Balkans moderated by Janusz Bugajski, the Ambassador of Macedonia H.E. Zoran Jolevski stated:

Greece, in essence, moved the goal posts further away, and our fear is that they will continue to move the goal posts again, and again, and again. The question then becomes, will they stop? Because, dear friends, the dignity and identity of an entire nation is at stake here that cannot be compromised.

Later on, they moved into an open discussion where the Greek Ambassador to the U.S. Alexandros Mallias stated that Greece would accept the last proposal by the UN Mediator Matthew Nimetz for the international use of "Republic of Northern Macedonia".

==== Geneva talks ====
On 22 June 2009, the UN Mediator Matthew Nimetz, together with the negotiators from both sides gathered in Geneva to discuss the differences and the problematic points of the dispute. According to Nimetz, the negotiations had made some progress which identified and discussed the issues that had so far stalled the solution process. Both sides were strong on their positions. Mediator Nimetz visited the Republic of Macedonia on July 6 to July 8, then Greece from July 8 to July 10.

==== August 2009 ====
In August 2009, UN mediator Matthew Nimetz expressed pessimism regarding the Greek response to the names he proposed in his July meetings. Nimetz said "Efforts to solve the name issue continue, even though Greece's answer is not positive". According to the Greek representative, Athens would not accept a proposed formulation that was only intended for use in bilateral relations, and insisted that any name that is decided must be used internationally. In late August, Nimetz met Zoran Jolevski, the ethnic Macedonian negotiator who said that "Macedonia is committed to active participation in the talks over the name and we expect a mutually acceptable solution, which will ensure preserving of the identity, dignity and integrity of the Macedonian citizens on the basis of Euro-Atlantic values and democratic principles." The "name talks" were frozen because of Athens' rejection of essential points in the most recent proposal and the elections in Greece in October. The actual talks may, it was reported, restart in May 2010 when the new Greek prime minister would have more space for negotiations.

=== Developments in 2010 ===
==== April 2010 ====
In early April 2010, it emerged that the Greek government considered "Northern Macedonia" a possible compromise name, indicating it was up to the Republic of Macedonia to decide whether to accept that proposal. The Macedonian Prime minister Nicola Gruevski declared he would reject this proposition and called for a vote on the new name.

==== June 2010 ====
The June 13th issue of Kathimerini reported that sources claimed that Greece and the Republic of Macedonia appeared to be close to a solution to their name dispute, and were set to agree on using the name of the Vardar river (the longest river in the Republic of Macedonia) to differentiate the Republic of Macedonia from Greek Macedonia. It is not clear at this stage if this would mean Republic of Macedonia would be called "Republic of Macedonia of Vardar", "Republic of Vardar Macedonia", "Vardar Republic of Macedonia" or "Republic of Macedonia (Vardar)".

Macedonian diaspora organizations, such as the Macedonian Human Rights Movement International (MHRMI) and the Australian Macedonian Human Rights Committee (AMHRC), launched a campaign placing advertisements in newspapers and billboards across Macedonia "demanding an end to all negotiations with Greece over its name".

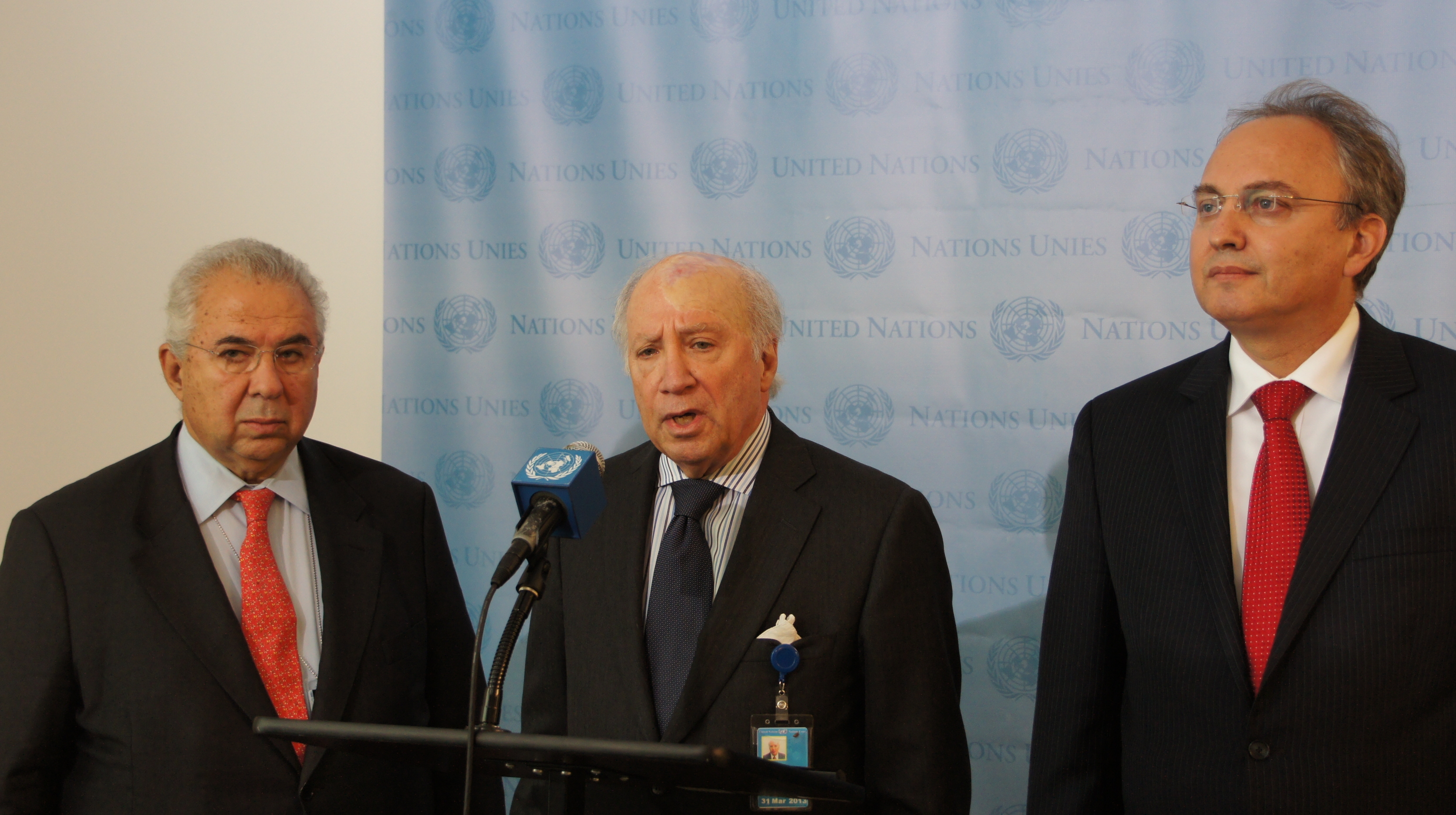
UN Mediator Matthew Nimetz with negotiators Zoran Jolevski and Adamantios Vassilakis at a press conference after the round of negotiations in November 2012

=== Developments in 2011 ===
Reports were released saying that Antonis Samaras, the leader of New Democracy, would be summoned to the Hague trial issued by Skopje on Greece for breaking the 1995 Interim Agreement, after evidence was found of him addressing the Greek parliament and clearly stating that his Government (New Democracy then in power) vetoed the invitation of the Republic of Macedonia at the 2008 Bucharest NATO summit. Also in this year the dispute was inflamed by the erection of a statue in Skopje of a mounted warrior which copies a portrait of Alexander the Great attributed to the ancient Greek sculptor Lysippus, and the inauguration of a sports stadium named after Alexander's father Philip II. In his farewell speech to the Parliament, the outgoing prime minister George Papandreou listed the immediate settlement of the name issue as one of the 3 priorities of the next government.

On 5 December, the International Court of Justice ruled 15-1 (the Greek judge being the sole dissenter) that Greece had breached the 1995 Interim Accord and thus was wrong to block its neighbor's application for NATO membership at the Bucharest NATO Summit in 2008. However, the court also affirmed that it did not have jurisdiction to order Greece not to bring the issue up in other fora as it should be assumed that states "act in good faith."

=== November 2012 talks ===
After nearly two years of separate meetings between UN Mediator Matthew Nimetz and the two negotiators, a joint round of negotiations occurred in the UN Headquarters in New York. The UN mediator presented recommendations and ideas to both parties to consider; however, these proposals were not disclosed to the general public.

=== 2013 proposals ===
In April 2013, Matthew Nimetz proposed the name 'Upper Republic of Macedonia' which was backed by EU Enlargement Commissioner Štefan Füle. This proposal came after the Republic of Macedonia had previously rejected the 'Republic of Upper Macedonia' as a name. Greece has indicated that it would allow the Republic of Macedonia to join the EU and NATO if the word 'Upper' was included in its official name. In October 2013, Greece's chief negotiator in the naming dispute, Adamantios Vassilakis, proposed the name 'Slavic-Albanian Macedonia' to end the dispute. According to the Greek newspaper Kathimerini, Vassilakis's remark however had been misinterpreted, as he had only launched "Slavic-Albanian Macedonia" as a theoretical suggestion—and not a real serious suggestion—in order to describe the complexity of the problem from the Greek viewpoint.

=== December 2013 Vergina Sun draft law ===
In November 2013, the Liberal Party of Macedonia proposed a draft law to ban the use of the Vergina Sun for civil purposes within the Republic of Macedonia, as "a positive step that will result in the promotion of good neighborly relations between Macedonia and Greece". Greece claims the Vergina Sun as an exclusive national state symbol and lodged a claim for trademark protection of it with the WIPO in 1995. The draft law required the use of the symbol to be banned from use in the Macedonian president's office, events organized under state administration, public Macedonian institutions or political parties, NGOs, media, as well as individuals in the Republic of Macedonia. However, the draft was rejected in December 2013 by the VMRO-DPMNE-led majority of the Macedonian Parliament.

=== 2014 negotiations ===
In February 2014, the European Parliament passed a resolution stating that according to the parliament's assessment, the Copenhagen criteria were fulfilled sufficiently for the country to start its negotiations for EU accession, and called for the Council of the European Union to confirm the date for the start of accession negotiations straight away, as bilateral disputes must not be an obstacle for the start of talks—although they must be solved before the accession process. However, whether or not the Council agreed with the parliament's opinion, it made no mention of Macedonia's accession negotiations at its meeting in June 2014.

The UN mediator, Matthew Nimetz, also invited the parties for a new round of "name dispute" negotiations to begin on 26 March 2014. The invitation was accepted by both the Greek and Macedonian authorities. According to Nimetz, the two countries had managed at the latest stranded talks in October 2013, to reach consensus of adding a "geographic term" to the disputed "Republic of Macedonia" name, to be used internationally as the new official country name. Nimetz stressed however, that substantial disagreement still existed in regards of "where the geographic term should be placed", but hoped a new round of negotiations could end with a mutually agreed name. According to the newspaper coverage of the previous 2013-negotiations, Macedonia had favored using the name "Upper Republic of Macedonia" while Greece insisted it could only approve "Republic of Upper Macedonia", while disagreement also existed towards the scope of using the new official name—with Macedonia only being ready to accept its use in bilateral affairs involving Greece and not ready to accept the Greek demand of using it "obligatory for all purposes".

=== 2017–2018 developments ===
After successive defeats of the nationalist VMRO-DPMNE in both the general and municipal elections of the Republic of Macedonia, and the arrival to power of the pro-solution coalition led by the SDSM and DIU, efforts for the resolution of the naming dispute gained a new momentum, with the new prime minister Zoran Zaev vowing his determination to resolve the decades-old dispute with Greece.

Efforts between the governments of the two countries for resolving the name dispute intensified, and on 17 January 2018, UN-sponsored negotiations had resumed. The ambassadors Adamantios Vassilakis of Greece and Vasko Naumovski of Macedonia met in Washington with the UN Envoy, who suggested any of the following five names in his proposal, all containing the name Macedonia transliterated from Cyrillic: (Note: See:)

- "Republika Nova Makedonija" (Republic of New Macedonia)
- "Republika Severna Makedonija" (Republic of North Macedonia)
- "Republika Gorna Makedonija" (Republic of Upper Macedonia)
- "Republika Vardarska Makedonija" (Republic of Vardar Macedonia)
- "Republika Makedonija (Skopje)" (Republic of Macedonia (Skopje))

High-level contacts between the governments of the two countries also intensified, with the Macedonian Deputy Prime Minister visiting Athens for the name talks on January 9, and the Macedonian PM Zaev meeting with his Greek counterpart Alexis Tsipras on the sidelines of the World Economic Forum at Davos, Switzerland, on January 24. In the Davos meeting, the first of its kind in seven years, there appeared to be some resolution between the two PMs to end the naming dispute and to improve the relations between the two countries. In this context, the Macedonian PM agreed to take initiatives that could soothe Greek concerns over antiquisation policies, while the Greek PM agreed to consent on Macedonia's bid to regional initiatives or agreements.

After the Davos meeting, Zaev announced that streets and locations such as the Alexander the Great airport in Skopje which were named by the nationalist VMRO-DPMNE after ancient Macedonian heroes and figures such as Alexander the Great, could be renamed as a sign of goodwill towards Greece. Specifically, Zaev declared that the Alexander the Great Highway, the E-75 motorway that connects Skopje to Greece, could be renamed to "Friendship Highway". In exchange, the Greek PM announced that Greece could consent to Macedonia's bid to the Adriatic-Ionian Cooperation Agreement and the Hellenic Parliament could ratify the second phase of the FYROM – European Union Association Agreement as part of the Accession of Macedonia to the European Union which was blocked in 2009 by Greece owing to the name dispute. (Note: See:) The two PMs also agreed that the name talks would be promoted to the Foreign Ministerial level instead of the Ambassadorial, with the foreign ministers of the two countries, Nikola Dimitrov of Macedonia and Nikos Kotzias of Greece, replacing Naumovski and Vasilakis respectively.

Furthermore, the two governments agreed to confidence-building measures that could help improve the relations between the two countries.

The latest options put forward by Skopje in February 2018 were "Republic of North Macedonia", "Republic of Upper Macedonia", "Republic of Vardar Macedonia" and "Republic of Macedonia (Skopje)".

In late February 2018, the government and institutions of the Republic of Macedonia announced the halt of the Skopje 2014 program, which aimed to make Macedonia's capital have a "more classical appeal" and begun removing its controversial monuments and statues. The Macedonian Ministry of Culture also has set up a Commission to envisage the possibility of removing the rest of them, such as of Alexander the Great and Philip II of Macedon. (Note: See:)

In Spring 2018, extensive negotiations in a bid to resolve the naming dispute were held in rounds, with frequent meetings of the foreign ministers of Greece and Macedonia achieving tangible progress on the naming dispute. Eventually, on May 17, at the sidelines of the EU-Western Balkan summit of Sofia, Bulgaria, the prime ministers of the two countries met, and discussed a new name, in addition to the 5 other names already proposed by UN Envoy Nimetz:

- "Republika Ilindenska Makedonija" (Republic of Ilinden Macedonia)

The Macedonian PM Zoran Zaev said that the Macedonian side was willing to accept this name and have it be used for all purposes, which is one of the Greek conditions for resolving the naming dispute. (Note: See:)

On 1 November 2018, Greece resumed air travel to Macedonia for the first time in 12 years. The first flight was an Olympic Air flight from Athens to Skopje, which included the Macedonian deputy prime minister Bujar Osmani, who was returning from talks in Greece. The same day, he tweeted that Greece had become Macedonia's "greatest ally", and noted the reestablishment of air travel as a sign of improved relations.

== Prespa Agreement ==
On 12 June 2018, Greek Prime Minister Alexis Tsipras announced that an agreement had been reached with his Macedonian counterpart Zoran Zaev on the dispute, "which covers all the preconditions set by the Greek side". The proposal would result in the Republic of Macedonia being renamed the Republic of North Macedonia (Macedonian: Република Северна Македонија, romanized: Republika Severna Makedonija; Greek: Δημοκρατία της Βόρειας Μακεδονίας), with the new name being used for all purposes (erga omnes), that is, domestically, in all bilateral relations and in all regional and international organizations and institutions. The agreement was signed at Lake Prespa, a body of water which is divided among the Republic of Macedonia, Greece, and Albania.

The deal includes recognition of the Macedonian language in the United Nations, noting that it is within the group of South Slavic languages, and that the citizenship of the country will be called Macedonian/citizen of the Republic of North Macedonia. Also, there is an explicit clarification that the citizens of the country are not related to the ancient Macedonians. Specifically, Article 7 mentions that both countries acknowledge that their respective understanding of the terms "Macedonia" and "Macedonian" refers to a different historical context and cultural heritage. When reference is made to Greece, these terms denote the area and people of its northern region, as well as the Hellenic civilization, history and culture of that region. When reference is made to Republic of North Macedonia, these terms denote its territory, language and people, with their own, distinctly different, history and culture. Additionally, the agreement stipulates the removal of the Vergina Sun from public use in the Republic of Macedonia and the formation of a committee for the review of school textbooks and maps in both countries for the removal of irredentist content and to align them with UNESCO and Council of Europe's standards. These changes were put to a referendum for citizens of the Republic of Macedonia in the autumn of 2018.

=== Signature ===
The Prespa Agreement, which replaces the Interim Accord of 1995, was signed on 17 June 2018 in a high-level ceremony at the Greek border village of Psarades on Lake Prespa, by the two foreign ministers Nikola Dimitrov and Nikos Kotzias and in the presence of the respective prime ministers, Zoran Zaev and Alexis Tsipras. The meeting was attended by the UN's Special Representative Matthew Nimetz, the Under-Secretary-General for Political Affairs Rosemary DiCarlo, the EU's High Representative of the Union for Foreign Affairs and Security Policy Federica Mogherini, and the European Commissioner for Enlargement and European Neighbourhood Policy Johannes Hahn, among others. After the ceremony, the prime ministers crossed over the border to the Macedonian side of Lake Prespa for lunch at the village of Oteševo, in a highly symbolic move that marked the first time a Greek Prime Minister ever entered the neighboring country since it declared independence in 1991.

=== Further developments ===
On June 13, 2018, Zoran Zaev said that Macedonia would be changing the license plates of its vehicles from MK to NMK to reflect the country's new name. However, the ISO 3166-1 codes would remain as MK (alpha-2 code) and MKD (alpha-3 code)

The Macedonian government announced that the statues of Alexander the Great, Philip II of Macedon and Olympias of Epirus, which were raised as part of the Skopje 2014 program, would be given new inscriptions with clarifications that they symbolize the Ancient Greek period and are "honouring Greek-Macedonian friendship".

On June 20, the Prespa Agreement was ratified by the Parliament of the Republic of Macedonia with 69 MPs voting in favor of it. Opposition party VMRO-DPMNE boycotted the parliamentary session and declared the Prespa treaty as a "genocide of the legal state" and a "genocide of the entire nation".

On June 25, the Greek Foreign Ministry informed the EU and NATO that Greece was no longer objecting to Macedonia's Euro-Atlantic accession under the new name. The next day, however, the Macedonian President Gjorge Ivanov refused to sign the agreement and threatened the Macedonian PM Zaev and the ruling coalition's MPs with imprisonment of at least 5 years for voting in favor of an agreement which, according to Ivanov, puts the Republic of Macedonia in a subordinate position to a foreign state. "I do not accept the constitutional change aimed at changing the constitutional name [of the country]. I do not accept ideas or proposals which would endanger Macedonia's national identity, the individuality of the Macedonian nation, the Macedonian language and the Macedonian model of coexistence. In the presidential election, 534,910 citizens voted in favor of this electoral program and elected me as President of the Republic of Macedonia. The agreement goes beyond the scope of United Nations Security Council Resolutions 817 (1993) and 845 (1993), since it refers to the "difference in the name of the State" and not to the "disputes" to which the agreement refers", Ivanov said, adding that "This agreement brings the Republic of Macedonia to subordination from another country, namely the Republic of Greece. According to Article 308 of the Penal Code, "a citizen who brings the Republic of Macedonia to a state of subservience or dependence on another state is punishable by imprisonment of at least five years". The legalization of this agreement creates legal consequences that are the basis for committing a crime."

The withdrawal of the Greek veto resulted in the European Union approving on June 27 the start of accession talks with the Republic of Macedonia, which are expected in 2019, under the condition that the Prespa deal was implemented and Macedonia's constitutional name was changed to Republic of North Macedonia.

On July 5, the Prespa Agreement was ratified again by the Macedonian parliament with 69 MPs voting in favor of it.

On July 11, NATO invited Macedonia to start accession talks in a bid to become the Euro-Atlantic alliance's 30th member.

On July 30, the parliament of Macedonia approved plans to hold a non-binding referendum on changing the country's name that took place on September 30. 94% of voters voted in favour with a 37% turnout, but the referendum was not carried because of a constitutional requirement for a 50% turnout. Total turnout for the referendum was at 666,344 and of those some 260,000 were ethnic Albanian voters of Macedonia. The government intended to push forward with the name change.

On October 15, 2018, the parliament of Macedonia began debating the name change. The proposal for the constitutional reform required the vote of 80 MPs, i.e. two-thirds of the 120-seat parliament.

On 19 October the parliament voted to start the process of renaming the country "North Macedonia", after a total of 80 MPs voted in favour of the constitutional changes.

On 3 December 2018, Macedonia's Parliament approved a draft constitutional amendment, with 67 lawmakers voting in favour, 23 voting against and 4 abstaining. A simple majority was needed at this stage.

After some political wrangling over constitutional issues related to the multi-ethnic makeup of the state, all Albanian political parties of Macedonia voted in favour of the name change along with the governing Socialists and some members of the opposition. On 11 January 2019, the Parliament of North Macedonia completed the legal implementation of the Prespa Agreement by approving the constitutional changes for renaming the country to North Macedonia with a two-thirds parliamentary majority (81 MPs).

The international community, NATO and European Union leaders, including Greek PM Alexis Tsipras and Austrian Chancellor Sebastian Kurz, as well as heads of neighboring states, congratulated the Macedonian Prime Minister Zoran Zaev. The British Prime Minister Theresa May described the vote as an "historic moment", while the Kosovar President Hashim Thaçi expressed his hope that the Prespa Agreement, which resolved the Macedonia Naming Dispute, can be used as a "model" for resolving Kosovo's dispute with Serbia as well. Albanian President Ilir Meta congratulated the name change and Albanian Foreign Minister Ditmir Bushati hailed the vote by tweeting that Albanian political parties were the "decisive factor".

On 25 January 2019, Greece's Parliament approved the Prespa Agreement with 153 votes in favor and 146 votes against. The international community, including the Prime Ministers Justin Trudeau of Canada and Boyko Borisov of Bulgaria, President Hashim Thaçi of Kosovo, the President of the EU, Donald Tusk, the President of EU's Commission Jean-Claude Juncker, Germany's and Albania's foreign Ministers, Heiko Maas and Ditmir Bushati respectively, as well as NATO's chief Jens Stoltenberg, welcomed positively the ratification of the deal. (Note: See:) Furthermore, the Republic of North Macedonia's Prime Minister Zoran Zaev in his congratulatory message to his Greek counterpart Alexis Tsipras whom he called "a friend", described the ratification as an "historic victory", which "ends a long-standing diplomatic conflict between Athens and Skopje". Shortly after the ratification of the deal, Greece's Foreign Minister Georgios Katrougalos signed, in the Greek Parliament, the enacted law of the Prespa Agreement.

Ecumenical Patriarchate of Constantinople and the Church of Greece have not recognised the Macedonian Orthodox Church (accepted by the other churches in 2022) as autocephalous as of 2023 because of their refusal to change their name among other disputes.

== Positions ==
=== Greek position ===
The former constitutional name of the country "Republic of Macedonia" and the short name "Macedonia", when used referring to the country, were considered offensive by some Greeks. The Greek government officially used the United Nations' provisional reference for the country ("the former Yugoslav Republic of Macedonia"), which was also used by many other international organisations. The Greek Ministry of Foreign Affairs described their concerns as follows:

The issue of the name of the Former Yugoslav Republic of Macedonia is not just a dispute over historical facts or symbols. It concerns the conduct of a UN member state, the Former Yugoslav Republic of Macedonia, which contravenes the fundamental principles of international law and order; specifically, respect for good neighbourly relations, sovereignty and territorial integrity. The name issue is thus a problem with regional and international dimensions, consisting in the promotion of irredentist and territorial ambitions on the part of the Former Yugoslav Republic of Macedonia, mainly through the counterfeiting of history and usurpation of Greece's national, historical and cultural heritage. ...

The roots of the name issue go back to the mid-1940s, when, in the aftermath of the Second World War, Commander in Chief Tito separated from Serbia the region that had been known until that time as Vardar Banovina (today's Former Yugoslav Republic of Macedonia), giving it the status of a federal unit of the new Socialist Federal Republic of Macedonia [sic], renaming it, initially, the "People's Republic of Macedonia", and, later, the "Socialist Republic of Macedonia". At the same time, he started to cultivate the idea of a separate and discrete "Macedonian nation".

George Papandreou, a former prime minister of Greece and leader of the governing PASOK party, has stated that when he was Minister for Foreign Affairs in January 2002, was next to a deal with Skopje leadership about using "Горна Македонија" ("Gorna Makedonija" – "Upper Macedonia" in Slavic). The other parties and the President of Greece, he said, were informed but the proposal failed because the 2001 Macedonia conflict had broken out. The Academy of Athens concludes:

The adoption of a compound name with a geographic content and with respect for the distinction between ancient Macedonia and the state of FYROM, would serve both the truth and the present-day needs of the geographic region and of the larger area surrounding it. The Greek interest does indicate the concern of public opinion in the face of intransigent provocations on the part of Skopje that tend—as is evident even in the school textbooks—not only to appropriate but even to monopolise the history, the cultural achievements, the symbols—including the ancient ones—the monuments, and the personalities that were active in the Macedonian area in the past. It is self-evident that the expression of good will on the part of any Greek government is not sufficient to overcome the fact or the effects of nationalist excesses similar to those that were artfully cultivated during the post-war period.

==== Historical concerns ====
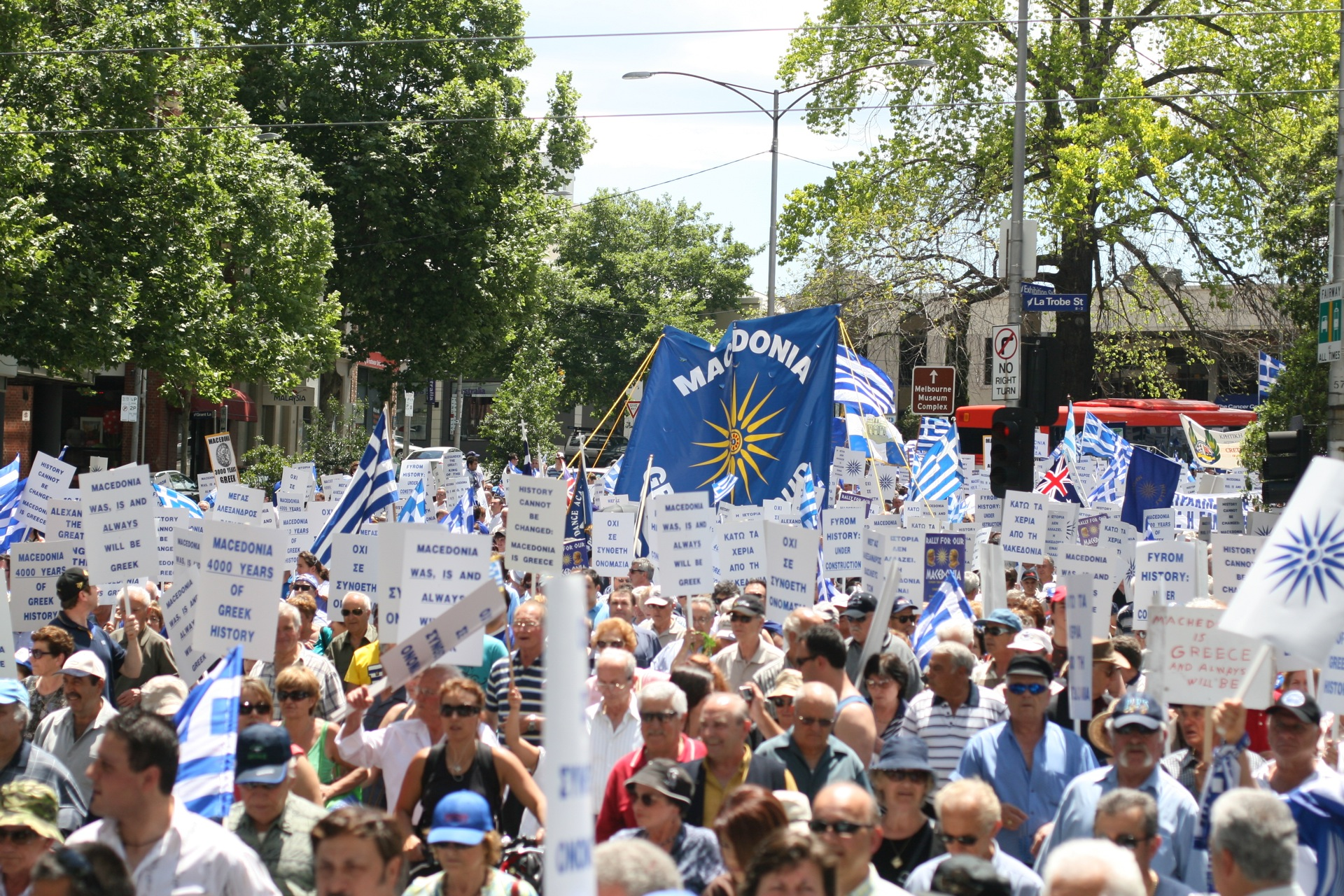
Macedonians (Greeks) protest in a rally in Melbourne in April 2007, holding signs descriptive of the historical concerns around the naming dispute and others with the Vergina sun.

The historian Eugene Borza summarises historic controversy surrounding the naming dispute as "... one of the enduring characteristics of modern Greek life: a desperate attempt to regain a past glory, rooted in cultural accomplishments of antiquity and the religious and political might of Byzantium. An identification with the ancient Macedonians is part of that attempt", while on the other hand, the ethnic Macedonians, being "a newly emergent people in search of a past to help legitimise their precarious present" whose ethnicity developed in the twentieth century, had no history and needed one.

Greeks argue that the name Macedonia is historically inseparably associated with Greek culture, ever since the ancient kingdom of Macedonia and the ancient Macedonians. They therefore consider that only Greeks have a historical right to use the name today, since the modern south Slavs arrived 1,000 years after that kingdom, lacking any relation to ancient Macedonia or its Greek culture. The policy of antiquization, i.e. efforts by ethnic Macedonians to construct a narrative of ethnic continuity linking them to the ancient Macedonians in various ways and symbolic actions underlining such claims, such as the public use of the Vergina sun symbol as a flag of the Republic of Macedonia, or the renaming of Skopje International Airport to "Alexander the Great Airport" met strong criticism from the Greek side, international media that report on the issue, and even from moderate political views in the Republic of Macedonia itself.

A 22-meter-tall statue, "Man on a Horse", depicting Alexander the Great, was erected in 2011 in Skopje, the capital city of the Republic of Macedonia, as part of a historical public arts building campaign. Greece scornfully characterised the effort, with the foreign ministry commenting on the size of the statue as "inversely proportional to seriousness and historical truth". The project received criticism by the European Union, calling it "not helpful" as well as by Skopje architects and ethnic Macedonian academics and politicians commenting on the aesthetic outcome and the semantics of such a move.

The Greek view also stresses that the name Macedonia as a geographical term historically used to refer typically to the southern, Greek parts of the region (including the capital of the ancient kingdom, Pella), and not or only marginally to the territory of today's Republic. They also note that the territory was not called Macedonia as a political entity until 1944.

Several hundred international and Greek classical scholars have lobbied for the historical concerns regarding the name dispute to be reflected in U.S. policy.

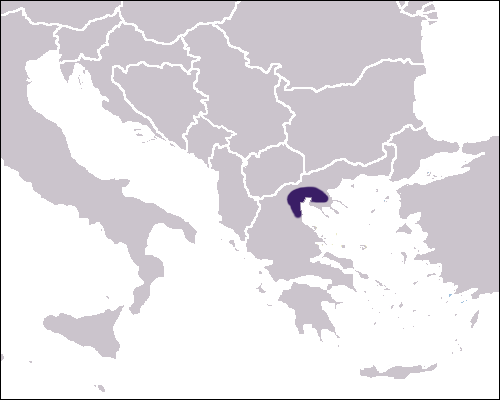
The ancient kingdom of Macedonia before Philip II (431 BC)

Ancient Macedonia at the death of Philip II (336 BC)

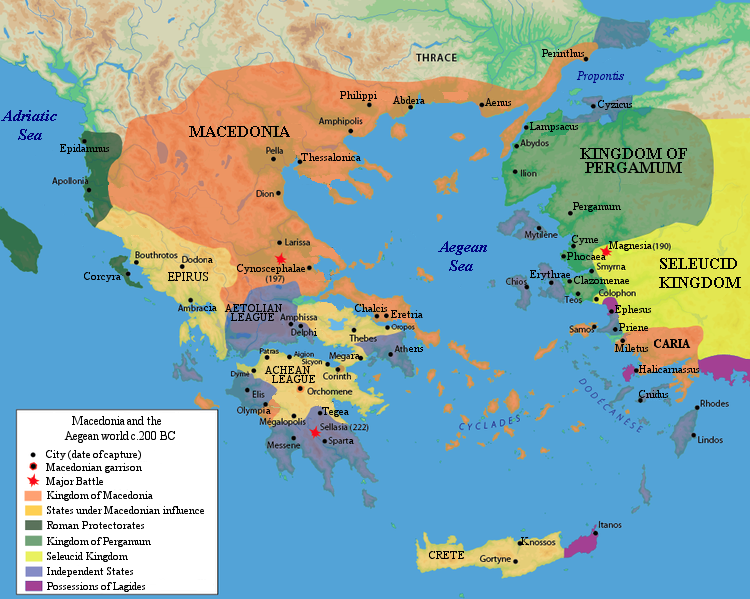
Ancient Macedonia under Philip V (200 BC)

Roman province of Macedonia (146 BC – 4th century AD)

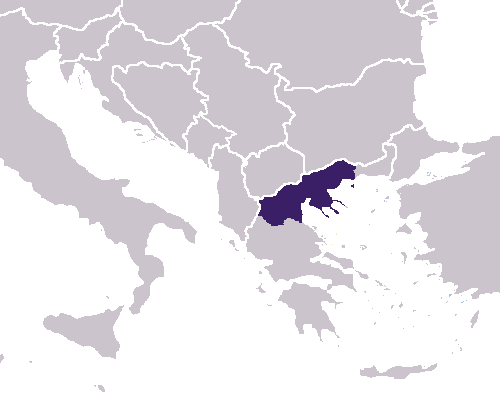
Modern region of Greek Macedonia

==== Territorial concerns ====
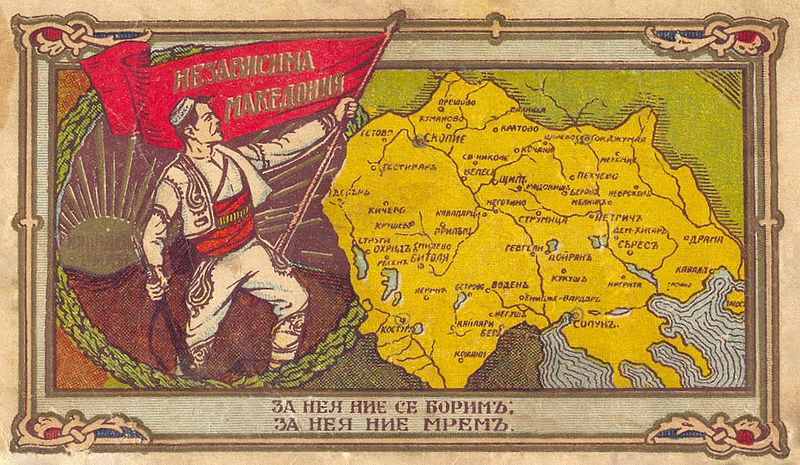
Postcard issued during the 1920s by the Ilinden organization in Sofia, presenting an imagined United Macedonia

During the Greek Civil War, in 1947, the Greek Ministry of Press and Information published a book, Ἡ ἐναντίον τῆς Ἑλλάδος ἐπιβουλή (Designs on Greece), including documents and speeches on the ongoing Macedonian issue, many translations from Yugoslav officials. It reports Josip Broz Tito using the term "Aegean Macedonia" on 11 October 1945 in the buildup to the Greek Civil War; the original document is archived in "GFM A/24581/G2/1945". For Athens in 1947, the "new term, Aegean Macedonia" (also "Pirin Macedonia"), was introduced by Yugoslavs. Contextually, this observation indicates this was part of the Yugoslav offensive against Greece, laying claim to Greek Macedonia, but Athens does not seem to take issue with the term itself. The 1945 date concurs with Bulgarian sources.

Tito's wartime representative to Macedonia, general Tempo (Svetozar Vukmanović), is credited with promoting the usage of the new regional names of the Macedonian region for irredentist purposes. Concerns over territorial implications of the usage of the term "Macedonian" were expressed as early as 1944 by U.S. diplomats.

Greece has been concerned for decades that the Republic of Macedonia was having territorial ambitions in the northern Greek provinces of Macedonia. As far back as 1957, the Greek government expressed concern about reported Yugoslav ambitions to create an "independent" People's Republic of Macedonia with the Greek city of Thessaloniki as its capital.

Loring M. Danforth ascribes the goal of a "free, united, and independent Macedonia" including "liberated" Bulgarian and Greek territory to a fraction of extreme Macedonian nationalists, whereas more moderate ethnic Macedonians recognise the inviolability of the borders but regard the presence of ethnic Macedonians in the neighbouring countries as an issue of minority protection.

Greek analysts and politicians have expressed concerns that overseas observers tend to overlook or not to understand the severity of the perceived territorial threat and tend to misunderstand the conflict as a trivial issue over a name.

The concerns are further reinforced by the fact that extremist ethnic Macedonian nationalists of the "United Macedonia" movement have expressed irredentist claims to what they refer to as "Aegean Macedonia" (in Greece), "Pirin Macedonia" (in Bulgaria), "Mala Prespa and Golo Brdo" (in Albania), and "Gora and Prohor Pchinski" (in Kosovo and Serbia). Greek Macedonians, Bulgarians, Albanians, and Serbs form the overwhelming majority of the population of each part of the region respectively.

Schoolbooks and official government publications in the Republic have shown the country as part of an unliberated whole.

In April 2008, Foreign Minister of Greece Dora Bakoyannis complained about the prime minister Nikola Gruevski appearing in a photograph, by a map of "Greater Macedonia" which included Thessaloniki and a great part of Northern Greece. The complaint was made inside an article published at Wall Street Journal, regarding the NATO ascension talks.

==== Self-determination ====
Apogevmatini headline quoting former Prime Minister Kostas Karamanlis: "I am a Macedonian, just like two and a half million Greeks."

According to both the official Greek position and various public demonstrations in Greece and the Greek diaspora, the Greek Macedonians felt that their right to self-determination was violated by what they regarded as the monopolisation of their name by a neighbouring country.

The strong regional identity of the Macedonians was emphasised by the Prime Minister of Greece, Kostas Karamanlis, who in January 2007 during a meeting of the Council of Europe in Strasbourg declared that:

I am a Macedonian, just like two and a half million Greeks.

In Greece, the extreme position on the issue suggested that there must be "no Macedonia in the title" of a neighbouring country.

Professor Danforth reported:

From the Greek nationalist perspective, then, the use of the name "Macedonian" by the "Slavs of Skopje" constitutes a "felony", an "act of plagiarism" against the Greek people. By calling themselves "Macedonians" the Slavs are "stealing" a Greek name; they are "embezzling" Greek cultural heritage; they are "falsifying" Greek history. As Evangelos Kofos, a historian employed by the Greek Foreign Ministry told a foreign reporter, "It is as if a robber came into my house and stole my most precious jewels—my history, my culture, my identity".

More moderate positions suggested that a disambiguating element should be added to the name of the neighbouring state and its people (such as "Vardar", "New", "Upper" or "North"), so as to illustrate the distinction between not just the two, but all groups of self-identifying Macedonians.

==== Semiological confusion ====
The contemporary region of Macedonia is a wider region in the Balkan peninsula that spans across several modern states, mainly Greece (Greek Macedonia), Bulgaria (Blagoevgrad province), the Republic of Macedonia, and Albania (around the Ohrid and Prespa lakes). The definite borders of the region are vague, but most contemporary geographers agree on its general location. There are several ethnic groups in this region, mostly living within their respective states, all of which are technically "Macedonians" in the regional sense. The Republic itself has a substantial minority (25.2%) of ethnic Albanians who are "Macedonians" both in the regional sense, and as legal citizens of the Republic. However, in a Balkans where ethnicity rather than nationhood defines peoples' identity, Albanians are never referred to (or refer to themselves) as Macedonians.

The Greek position suggests that the monopolisation of the name by the Republic and its citizens creates semiological confusion with Macedonian Greeks, as it becomes increasingly difficult to disambiguate which "Macedonia", which "Macedonians" and what "Macedonian language" are referred to in each occasion.

According to a source Bulgarians living in Blagoevgrad province (Bulgarian Macedonia) are reported to not identify themselves with their regional term "Macedonians" (Macedonian Bulgarians), so as not to be confused with the ethnic Macedonians. According to other sources the traditional use of the term "Macedonians" in Bulgaria as a regional designation continues.

Aromanians are often called machedoni by Romanians, as opposed to the citizens of Macedonia, who are called macedoneni. However, most Aromanians do not use designations such as machedoni, rather they have a diverse set of self-designations. While some Aromanians self-identify as ethnic Macedonians and Greek Macedonians, particularly those in North Macedonia and Greek Macedonia, only a small number call themselves terms such as makedonji and distinguish themselves from both groups. In Romania, the Aromanians as well as the Megleno-Romanians are sometimes known as "Macedo-Romanians".

The Greek Macedonians demonstrate a strong regional identity and identify themselves as Macedonians, who live in Macedonia, speaking a Macedonian dialect of modern Greek.

Demographic Macedonia
Group	Population	Definition
Macedonians	c. 5 million	All inhabitants of the region, irrespective of ethnicity
Macedonians (ethnic group)	c. 1.3 million plus diaspora	A contemporary ethnic group. In Greece they are usually referred to as Slavomacedonians or Macedonian Slavs or Slavophone Greeks
Macedonians/Citizens of North Macedonia	c. 2.0 million	Citizens of the Republic of North Macedonia irrespective of ethnicity
Macedonians (Greeks)	c. 2.6 million plus diaspora	An ethnic Greek regional group, also referred to as Greek Macedonians.
Ancient Macedonians	Unknown	A tribe of antiquity on the periphery of the Greek world
Macedonians (Bulgarians)	c. 320,000	A Bulgarian regional group; also referred to as Piriners.
Macedo-Romanians	c. 0.3 million (Note: The figure is the total number of Aromanians and Megleno-Romanians, therefore including those who reside outside of Macedonia.)	An alternative name for Aromanians and Megleno-Romanians used by Romanians.

=== Ethnic Macedonian position ===
==== Self-determination and self-identification ====
According to the government in Skopje, the preservation of the constitutional name, which is also used by many other international organisations, for both domestic and international use was of the utmost importance. The country asserted that it did not lay exclusive claim to the term Macedonia either in the geographic or the historic sense. Various demonstrations and protests in the Republic of Macedonia and the ethnic Macedonian diaspora were held to support their view that their right to self-determination was violated by what they regarded as the rejection of the name from the international community. The Macedonian Academy of Sciences and Arts suggested:

And today Slavs have been living there (Macedonia) for a period of 1,400 years. What is more natural than that the Balkanised Slavs who have lived so long and continuously in Macedonia should be called Macedonians and their language Macedonian?

Ethnic Macedonians claim they are descended from both original indigenous Macedonians and from the Slavic peoples who invaded the region in the 6th-8th century AD, thereby mixing both cultures and traditions.

==== Historical perspective ====
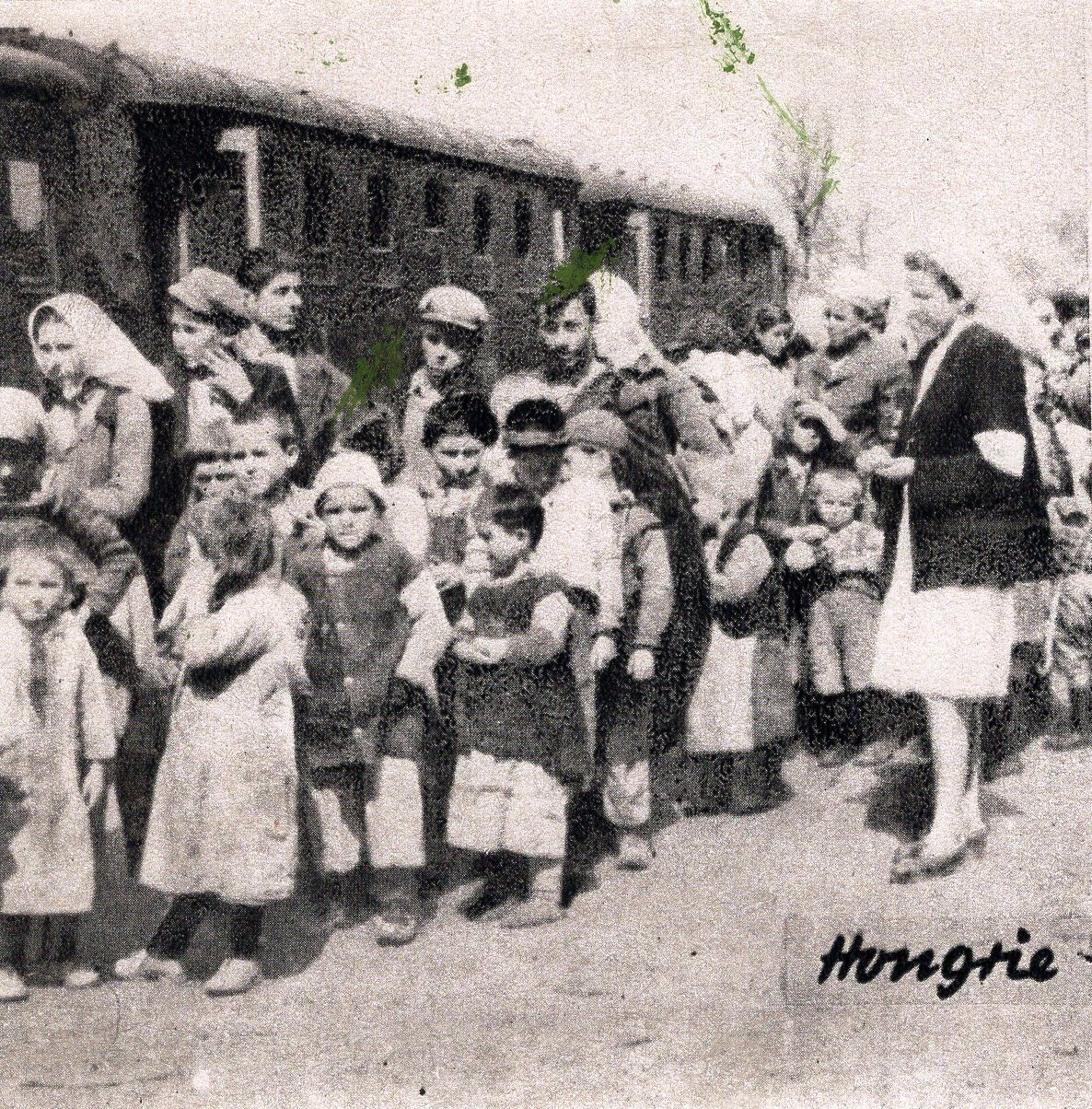
Refugee children fleeing across the Greek Macedonian border in 1948

It is observed that much of today's Greek Macedonia was only fully Hellenised by political and military means in modern times. After the division of Macedonia in 1913, Greece carried out a policy of Hellenisation of the local population, forcing geographical and personal name changes, religious affiliation, and writings of church frescoes and graves to Greek. During the Ioannis Metaxas era, Slavic-speaking Macedonians were deported or tortured for speaking or claiming to be Macedonian, and those with money were fined. Ethnic Macedonians argue that they have a more legitimate claim to the name Macedonia than modern Greek Macedonians who descend from the 638,000 Greek refugees who had emigrated from Anatolia, Epirus and Thrace and settled in Greek Macedonia during the early twentieth century.

The expelled Refugees of the Greek Civil War which consisted of over 28,000 children made up by a significant portion of ethnic Macedonians (possibly the majority) had their citizenship revoked in Greece and the Greek government's actions in seizing citizenship has been "historically been used against people identifying as ethnic Macedonians". Greece eventually softened the law by allowing the return of "all Greeks by genus who during the Civil War of 1946–1949 and because of it have fled abroad as political refugees", although this further denied those who had fled Greece following the Civil War and identified as ethnic Macedonians, refusing any Greek ethnic designation to regain citizenship and resettle in their centuries-old properties. This resulted in many depopulated and devastated villages, especially in Western Macedonia with confiscated properties eventually being given to people from outside of the area. Vlachs and Greeks were given property in the resettlement programme conducted by the Greek Government from the period 1952–1958.

==== Ethnic Macedonian minority in Greece ====
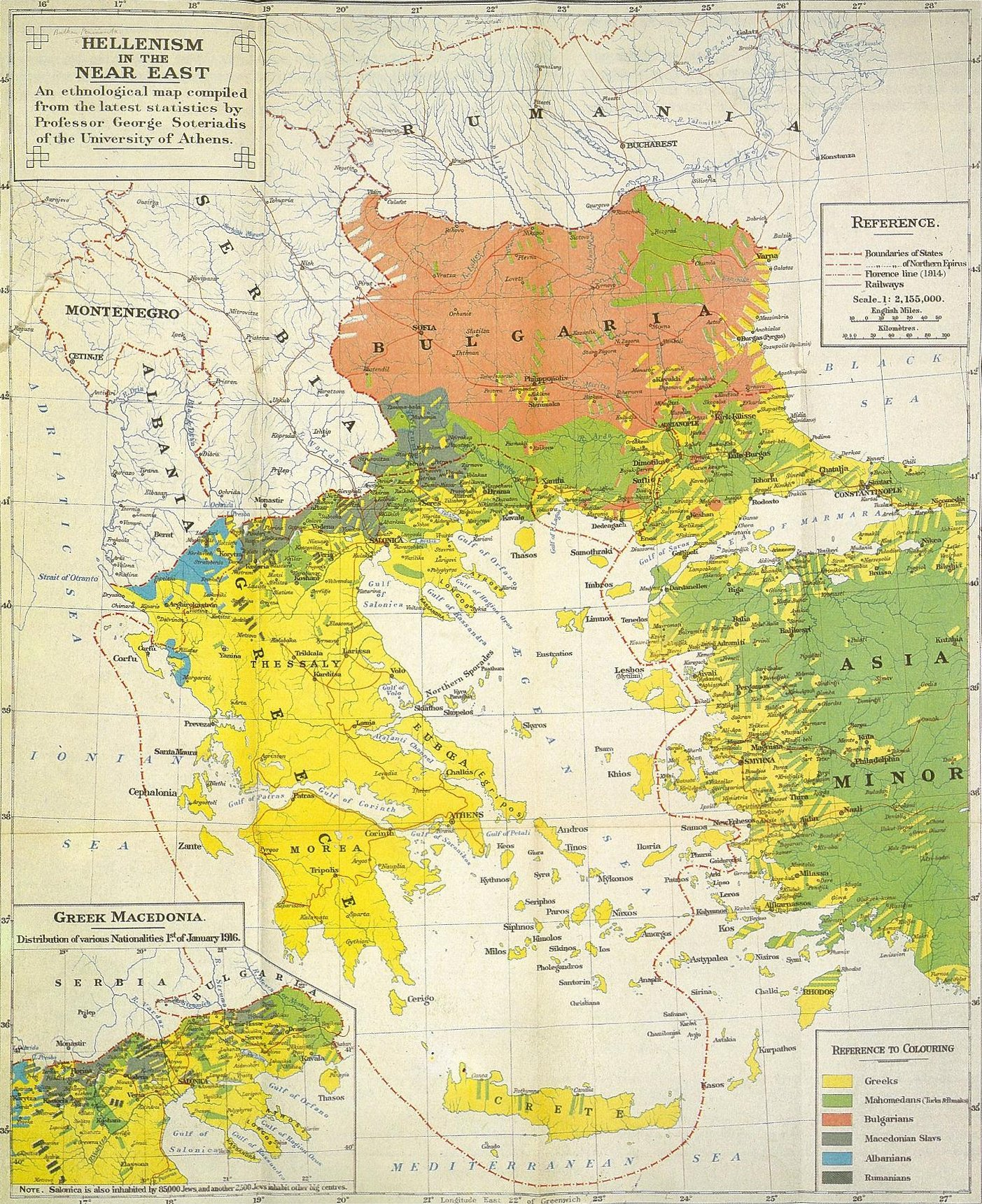
Greek ethnographic map of south-eastern Balkans, showing the Macedonian Slavs as a separate people, by Professor George Soteriadis, Edward Stanford, London, 1918

In the 6th and 7th centuries AD, Slavic people migrated into Roman Macedonia and competed with other populations of Macedonia, although over time adopting the Eastern Orthodox Christianity and Cyrillic script from Cyril and Methodius and Slavic languages have been spoken in the area alongside Greek in the region ever since. In parts of northern Greece, in the regions of Macedonia (Μακεδονία) and Thrace (Θράκη), Slavic languages continue to be spoken by people with a wide range of self-identifications. The actual linguistic classification of the Slavic dialects of Greece is unclear, although most linguists will classify them as either Bulgarian or Macedonian taking into account numerous factors, including the resemblance and mutual intelligibility of each dialect to the standard languages (abstand), and the self-identification of the speakers themselves. As however the vast majority of these people have a Greek national identity, linguists will make their decisions based on abstand alone. The Slavic-speaking minority of northern Greece can be divided in two main groups: Orthodox Christians and Muslims, primarily the Pomaks of Eastern Macedonia and Thrace. The latter has no reported connection to ethnic Macedonians.

The Christian portion of Greece's Slavic-speaking minority are commonly referred to as Slavophones (from the Greek Σλαβόφωνοι - Slavophōnoi, lit. "Slavic-speakers") or dopii, which means "locals" or "indigenous" in Greek (from Ancient Greek ἐντόπιος - entopios, "local"). The vast majority of them espouse a Greek national identity and are bilingual in Greek. They live mostly in the Periphery of Western Macedonia and belong to the Greek Orthodox Church, which in conjunction with the millet system of the Ottoman Empire which occupied the region until 1913, may explain their self-identification as Greeks. In the 1951 census, 41,017 people claimed to speak the Slavic language. One unofficial estimate for 2000 puts their number at 1.8% of the Greek population, that is c.200,000.

This group has received some attention due to claims from the Republic of Macedonia that these people form an ethnic Macedonian minority in Greece. There is indeed a minority within the Slavophone community in Greece which self-identifies as ethnic Macedonian. (Note: See:) The Greek Helsinki Monitor estimated that the number of ethnic Macedonians in Greek Macedonia ranged from 10,000 to 30,000 in 1999.

There is a dispute over the size of this alleged minority, with some Greeks denying it outright, and some ethnic Macedonians inflating the numbers substantially. The Greek Helsinki Monitor reports that, "difficult and therefore risky it is to declare a Macedonian minority identity in such an extremely hostile if not aggressive environment in Greece". There are no official statistics to confirm or deny either claims. The Greek government has thus far refused on the basis that there is no significant community and that the idea of minority status is not popular amongst the (Greek identifying) linguistic community of northern Greece as it would have the effect of them being marginalised.

Professor Danforth reported:

...Finally, the Greek government denies the existence of a Macedonian minority in northern Greece, claiming that there exists only a small group of "Slavophone Hellenes" or "bilingual Greeks," who speak Greek and "a local Slavic dialect" but have a "Greek national consciousness".

A political party promoting this line and claiming rights of what they describe as the "Macedonian minority in Greece"—the Rainbow (Виножито)—was founded in September 1998; it received 2,955 votes in the region of Macedonia in the 2004 elections. However the party has had cases of having its offices ransacked, members being arrested for using bilingual signs written in both Macedonian and Greek and facing violations from the Greek government as ruled by the European Convention on Human Rights.

=== Albanian position ===
The Albanian minority in North Macedonia did not view the name issue as an important problem. In the early 1990s Albanians of the Macedonian republic and wider region strongly opposed the suggestion of "Slavomacedonia" by the Greek side to name the country. For the Albanian community the name "Republic of Macedonia" was interpreted in territorial terms and not as having any particular Slavic associations. As such the Albanian minority held no objections toward references by Macedonian authorities to antiquity and only disagree to usage of Slavic symbols as Macedonia is perceived by them as being historically multiethnic. Albanians insisted that any new name would have to be ethnically neutral with proposals from them being "Vardar Republic", "Central Balkan Republic" and the classical name Dardania. Prior consultation on the name issue process was requested by Albanians.

=== Australian position ===
==== Victorian position ====
In the mid-1990s, then-Premier Jeff Kennett backed the Greek position over the Macedonian question in his attempts to shore up local electoral support. Kennett's stance gained him supporters from the Melburnian Greek community, whereas he was referred to as "Kennettopoulos" by the Macedonian community.

At Kennett's insistence, his state government in 1994 issued its own directive that all its departments refer to the language as "Macedonian (Slavonic)" and to Macedonians as "Slav Macedonians". Reasons given for the decision were "to avoid confusion", be consistent with federal naming protocols toward Macedonians and repair relations between Macedonian and Greek communities. It was accepted that it would not impact the way Macedonians self-identified themselves. The decision upset Macedonians, as they had to use the terms in deliberations with the government or its institutions related to education and public broadcasting. The Macedonian community challenged the decision on the basis of the Race Discrimination Act. After years of litigation at the Australian Human Rights and Equal Opportunity Commission (HREOC), the Federal Court and High Court, previous judicial rulings were upheld that found Kennett's directive unlawful as it caused discrimination based on ethnic background and was struck down from usage in 2000.

== Macedonian, language and dialect ==
=== Macedonian language (modern) ===
The name of the modern Macedonian language, as used by its speakers and defined in the constitution of the Republic of Macedonia is "Makedonski jazik" (Mакедонски јазик). The term "Macedonian language" is used by several international bodies, such as the United Nations and the World Health Organization. It is also used by convention in the field of Slavic studies.

However, because this language is a South Slavic Indo-European language, and not descended from Ancient Macedonian, which was a Hellenic Indo-European language, several other terms remain in use. Some of the names use the family to which the language belongs to disambiguate it from ancient Macedonian, or from the homonymous dialect of modern Greek; sometimes the autonym "Makedonski" is used in English for the modern Slavic language, with "Macedonian" being reserved for the ancient language.

Affirmation of the classification of Macedonian as a separate language is an important issue for the ethnic Macedonian self-view. Critics often treat it as a dialect of Bulgarian, due to their close structural affinity and mutual intelligibility in both written and spoken forms; they also point to Macedonian's recent emergence as a separate standard language, and the political motivation behind its promotion in the mid-20th century.

=== Macedonian dialect (modern, Greek) ===
Macedonian is applied to the present-day Greek dialect spoken by Macedonian Greeks.

=== Macedonian (ancient) ===
The ancient Macedonian was either a Greek dialect which was part of or closely related to the Northwest Doric and/or Aeolic dialects, or a sibling language of ancient Greek forming a Hellenic (i.e. Greco-Macedonian) supergroup. Some sources of this native speech are available (e.g. Hesychius' lexicon, Pella curse tablet). However, the surviving public and private inscriptions found in Macedonia indicate that the written language in ancient Macedonia was Attic Greek and later Koine Greek. Attic Greek, a form of the Greek language, eventually supplanted the ancient Macedonian entirely in Macedonia from the 5th Century BC, and it became extinct during the first few centuries AD. Attic Greek evolved into Koine Greek, then into Byzantine Greek and later into modern Greek.

== See also ==
- Macedonia (region)
- Macedonia (terminology)
- Macedonian Question
- Ireland–United Kingdom naming dispute
- Azerbaijan naming controversy
- List of homonymous states and regions
