= International recognition of the Donetsk People's Republic and the Luhansk People's Republic =

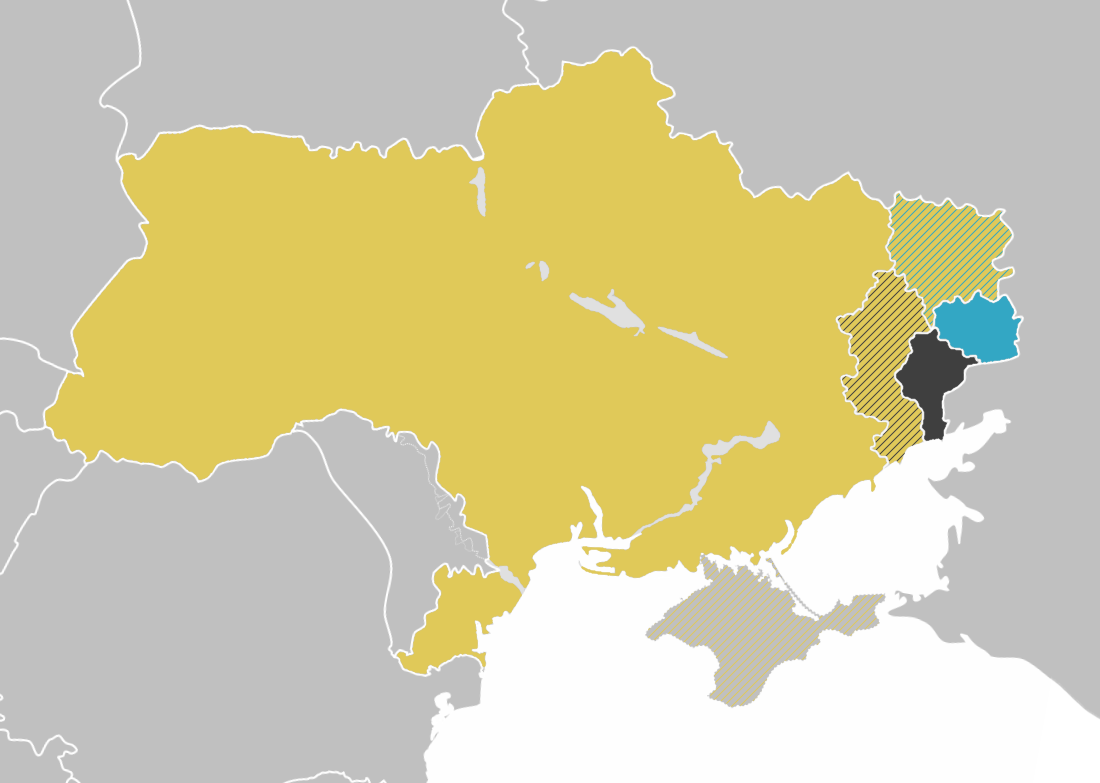
Ukraine between 2014 and 2022: Controlled by the Donetsk People's Republic Claimed by the Donetsk People's Republic (Donetsk Oblast) Controlled by the Luhansk People's Republic Claimed by the Luhansk People's Republic (Luhansk Oblast) Annexed by Russia (Crimea)

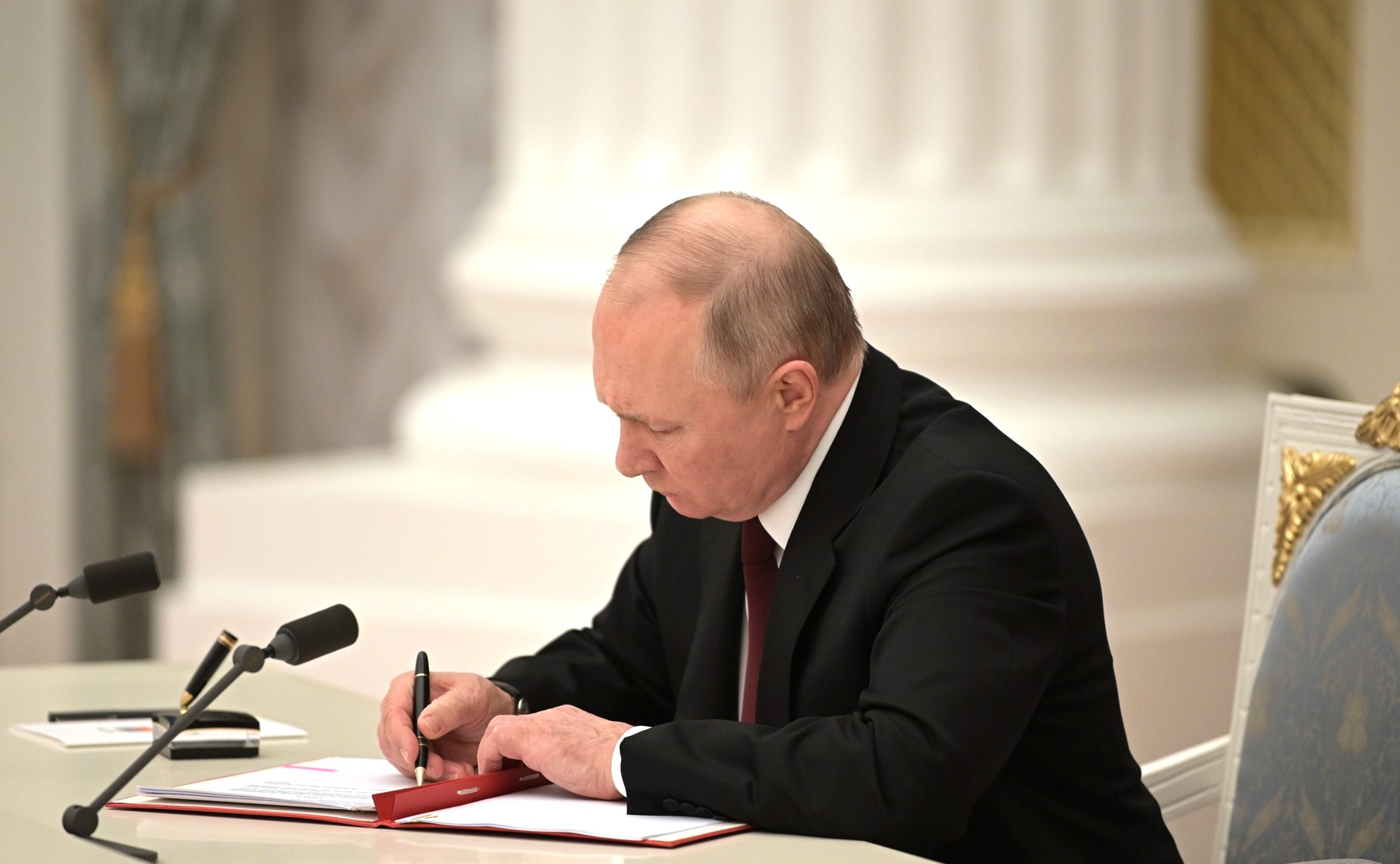
Vladimir Putin signs presidential decrees recognizing the DPR and LPR and treaties of friendship, cooperation and mutual assistance, 21 February 2022

Presidential decrees No. 71 (left) and No. 72 (right), recognizing the independence of the DPR and the LPR.

The Donetsk People's Republic (DPR) and the Luhansk People's Republic (LPR) are two regions that broke away from Ukraine when they were initially declared by Russian separatists to be independent sovereign states during the pro-Russian unrest in Ukraine in April 2014. Their secession occurred just one month after Russia annexed Crimea from Ukraine and triggered the War in Donbas. Both separatist movements received support from Russia, but their declarations of independence gained only limited international recognition. In September 2022, Russia annexed the DPR and the LPR, incorporating both of them as Russian republics with no sovereignty.

Since 2014, the Ukrainian government has classified Russian separatism as a terrorist movement. In addition to Ukraine, the majority of the international community, including the United Nations, has regarded the DPR and the LPR—like Crimea—as Ukrainian territory under Russian occupation. Three days before the Russian invasion of Ukraine in February 2022, Russia recognized the DPR and the LPR as independent and sovereign. Two other United Nations members followed: Syria in June 2022 and North Korea (which is involved in fighting against Ukraine) in July 2022. Although the two separatist states renounced their declarations of independence upon annexation, they have continued to claim the entirety of Ukraine's Donetsk Oblast and Luhansk Oblast on behalf of Russia's sovereign authority amidst the Russo-Ukrainian War.

Beyond United Nations members, the DPR and the LPR recognized each other. They were also recognized by two states with limited or no international recognition: South Ossetia (2014) and Abkhazia (2022). However, South Ossetia and Abkhazia are similarly classified by most of the international community as Georgian territory under Russian occupation since the Russian invasion of Georgia in August 2008.

The United Nations and most of the international community have consistently condemned the DPR and LPR's initial independence claims, as well as the subsequent annexation. Both are illegal under mainstream interpretations of international law, according to which the territory should belong to Ukraine.

Map of the international diplomatic situation of the Donetsk and Luhansk people's republics. Official recognition of the Donetsk and Luhansk people's republics Support for Russian recognition of the independence of the republics Support for Ukrainian territorial integrity, but no condemnation of Russian recognition Condemnation of Russian recognition of independence

== History ==
In November 2014, representatives of Novorossiya sent a request of diplomatic recognition to several Latin American states, including Cuba, Nicaragua, and Venezuela. Formal responses to the requests were not issued.

In May 2015, the confederation ceased its activities due to their "incompatibility with the Normandy Format plan of peace settlement", promoting for DPR and LPR becoming autonomous regions within the Ukrainian borders. The Minsk Accords laid out the process for this to be achieved.

On 15 February 2022, citing Ukraine's non-implementation of the Minsk Accords, the Russian State Duma voted to ask President Vladimir Putin to recognize the self-declared Donetsk and Luhansk People's Republics as independent states. The bill was proposed by the Communist Party.

On 21 February 2022, the State Duma of Russia passed a bill to officially recognize the self-proclaimed Donetsk People's Republic and Luhansk People's Republic in Eastern Ukraine as independent states. The bill was approved by President Vladimir Putin. On the same day, Putin signed decrees recognizing the Donetsk People's Republic and Luhansk People's Republic, and also signed agreements on friendship, cooperation, and assistance with the republics.

The moves between the State Duma and Putin have been described as coordinated and in prelude to a Russian invasion.

== Aftermath of Russian recognition ==
A February poll released by the independent Levada Center found that 45% of Russians backed Russia's recognition of the separatist-controlled Donetsk and Luhansk People's Republics.

On 24 February 2022, Russia began its full-scale invasion of Ukraine, which included sending troops into the DPR and LPR. The need to secure their territorial integrity was used as a legal justification.

State Duma deputy Mikhail Matveyev, who voted in favour of DPR and LPR recognition, denounced the invasion, stating:

"I voted for peace, not for war. I wanted Russia to become a shield so that Donbas would not be bombed, not for Kyiv to be bombed."

After limited success during a seven-month military campaign, Vladimir Putin recognized the Russian-occupied Kherson and Zaporizhzhia oblasts as independent states, and signed treaties of accession into the Russian Federation with the military-civil administrations of those two regions, as well as the DPR and LPR. This was despite not having full control of the four new regions, continuing to fight for it with the Ukrainians.

== Countries and entities that recognized the DPR and LPR as independent states ==
=== UN member states ===
	State	Date of recognition	Diplomatic relations established	Notes
1	Russia	21 February 2022	21 February 2022	In his address recognizing the DPR and LPR, Putin also supported their claims to the Donbas region of Ukraine. Further information: DPR–Russia relations and LPR–Russia relations
2	Syria	29 June 2022		In February 2022, Foreign Minister Faisal Mekdad stated "Syria supports President Vladimir Putin's decision to recognise the republics of Luhansk and Donetsk" at an event in Moscow. Syria's state news agency SANA later reported that Syria was "ready to build relations with republics of Luhansk and Donetsk". As a response to the recognition, Ukraine severed all of its diplomatic relations with Syria, and Syria did the same towards Ukraine on 20 July 2022. Prior to relations being severed, the embassies of the two countries were closed in 2016 and 2018 respectively during the Syrian civil war. Following the fall of the al-Assad regime on 8 December 2024, it is unknown what the foreign policy position of the new Syrian transitional government is with respect to the Russian-occupied territories of Ukraine. On 25 September 2025, during a bilateral meeting between Ukrainian president Volodymyr Zelenskyy and Syrian Interim president Ahmed al-Sharaa on the sidelines of the 80th United Nations General Assembly in New York, Ukraine and Syria announced the resumption of diplomatic relations. The discussions primarily focused on bilateral issues, including political, security, economic, and humanitarian cooperation. However, there was no mention of the Russian-occupied territories of Ukraine, and the matter was deliberately left outside the scope of the talks.
3	North Korea	13 July 2022		On 13 July 2022, the Korean Central News Agency reported that Foreign Minister of North Korea Choe Son-hui sent letters to counterparts in the republics of Donetsk and Luhansk, recognizing the independence of the republics and expressed the will to develop the state-to-state relations. As a result of the recognition, Ukraine has severed its diplomatic relations with North Korea.

=== Non-UN states ===
	State	Date of recognition	Diplomatic relations established	Notes
1	Donetsk People's Republic; Luhansk People's Republic	11 May 2014	11 May 2014	The Donetsk and Luhansk People's Republics both declared independence almost simultaneously, and were united under the Novorossiya confederation from 23 May 2014 to 20 May 2015.
2	South Ossetia	18 June 2014 (LPR); 27 June 2014 (DPR)	28 January 2015 (LPR); 12 May 2015 (DPR)	On 27 June 2014, South Ossetia's Security Council decided to recognize the Donetsk People's Republic. South Ossetia's president told the media: "I believe the recognition of the Donetsk republic is the right step, South Ossetia's people support and hail the decision to recognize Donetsk and Luhansk." Further information: DPR–South Ossetia relations
3	Abkhazia	25 February 2022	9 March 2022 (DPR); 10 March 2022 (LPR)	On 22 February 2022, the Ministry of Foreign Affairs published a statement welcoming the recognition of independence of the Donetsk and Luhansk People's Republics by Russian president Vladimir Putin. On 25 February 2022 President Aslan Bzhania announced the recognition of the Donetsk People's Republic and Luhansk People's Republic.

== Positions by other countries ==
=== Countries and entities that supported recognizing the DPR and LPR as independent states ===
==== UN member states ====
State	Notes
Belarus	Despite calls for recognition of the two republics, the Belarusian Foreign Ministry had rejected recognition but it has supported Russia's decision. The statement reads: "In such a situation, we respectfully understand the decision of the Russian side to recognize the independence of the Donetsk and Lugansk People's Republics. The Republic of Belarus has always actively and consistently advocated a peaceful settlement of the conflict in south-eastern Ukraine. We still consider diplomatic methods to be a priority and are ready to contribute to this process in every possible way."
Central African Republic	President Faustin-Archange Touadéra stated on RIA Novosti news “I believe that this decision will undoubtedly save lives and prevent a lot of violence. According to our analysis, this decision aims to save people's lives. This decision is supported by many because it aims to avoid violence and the loss of human lives.”
Nicaragua	President Daniel Ortega stated "I'm sure that if a referendum is held there, as was done in Crimea, people will vote for their regions to be included in Russia. This is a Russian population and it's not subject to the dictates of NATO, the EU and the U.S."
Sudan	The Deputy Head of the Sovereign Council Mohamed Hamdan Dagalo stated: "Russia has the right to act in the interests of its citizens and protect its people. It has the right under the constitution and under the law. The whole world must realize that it has the right to defend its people." Later on, the claims were denied.
Venezuela	President Nicolás Maduro "reaffirmed all his support" for Russian President Putin "in defense of peace in Russia", stating "the territory of Luhansk and Donetsk assumed the functions of people's republics to defend themselves from a massacre that the fascist sectors that had seized power in Ukraine began to execute hunting men, hunting women, assaulting families, bombing, with heavy weapons and a conflict began".

=== Countries and entities that did not support recognizing the DPR and LPR as independent states ===
==== UN member states ====
State	Notes
Albania	The Albanian Minister of Europe and Foreign Affairs Olta Xhaçka posted a statement on Twitter: "Albania condemns Russia's recognition of the independence of the regions of Donetsk & Luhansk. A clear violation of international law, of the Minsk agreement as well as a violation of Ukraine's territorial integrity and sovereignty. Albania stands united with partners and allies in support of Ukraine".
Argentina	The Ministry of Foreign Affairs and Worship echoed UN's Secretary General Gutérres' call for respect of territorial sovereignty and called for a peaceful resolution to the conflict. Argentina also called to respect the charter of the United Nations and international law.
Australia	The Australian Minister for Foreign Affairs condemned the Russian recognition of Donetsk and Luhansk as independent states, saying it "flagrantly undermines Ukraine's sovereignty and territorial integrity and has no validity under international law." The minister also condemned President Putin's announcement that Russia "is deploying so-called “peacekeepers” to eastern Ukraine; stating that "These personnel are not peacekeepers".
Austria	The Austrian Foreign Minister Alexander Schallenberg states that the recognition of the self-proclaimed Donetsk and Luhansk People's Republics by the Russian Federation represents "a grave violation of the sovereignty and territorial integrity of Ukraine which we categorically condemn."
Belgium	The Belgian Minister of Foreign Affairs Sophie Wilmès tweeted: "Belgium condemns the recognition of the separatist territories in #Ukraine. It is a violation of international law, the Minsk agreements and the territorial integrity of Ukraine. We will work closely with our EU and NATO partners for a strong and united reaction."
Bosnia and Herzegovina	Bosniak member of the Presidency Šefik Džaferović condemned Russia's moves to recognize the independence of Donetsk and Luhansk. "Bosnia and Herzegovina respects and supports the territorial integrity and sovereignty of Ukraine. I condemn the decision of the Russian Federation to recognize the two Ukrainian regions as states, which is a flagrant violation of international law," Džaferović said. Serb member of the Presidency Milorad Dodik said it was his personal opinion. He said that the Republika Srpska entity will seek neutrality at the national level regarding the issue of Ukraine, Radio Free Europe reported. The Presidency Chairman Željko Komšić strongly condemned "Russia's attack on the territory of Ukraine".
Bulgaria	For years, relations between Bulgaria and Russia were moderate. However, on the day of Putin's announcement, Prime Minister Kiril Petkov condemned Putin's recognition of Donetsk and Luhansk as independent entities. He stated, "We continue to maintain Ukraine's territorial integrity within its internationally recognized borders. International law must be respected. We, the European Union, will respond united in our defense." In that same statement, the Bulgarian Foreign Ministry released the statement that "the recognition of the Luhansk and Donetsk separatist republics is a gross violation of international law and undermines European security. Such an escalation requires a unified and decisive response."
Canada	Prime Minister of Canada Justin Trudeau condemned Putin's actions calling it "blatant violation of Ukraine's sovereignty". Trudeau went on to suggest economic sanctions would be applied.
China	Wang Wenbin, spokesperson for the Ministry of Foreign Affairs of the People's Republic of China, said in response to a reporter's question: "China's position on the Ukraine issue is consistent. The legitimate security concerns of any country should be respected, and the purposes and principles of the UN Charter should be jointly safeguarded."
Costa Rica	Costa Rican government stated that it supported the UN Secretary General's statement stating that the recognition of Donetsk People's Republic and the Luhansk People's Republic are violating Ukrainian territorial integrity. Costa Rica has also called for a de-escalation of the situation in Eastern Europe and the situation must be resolved by dialogue.
Croatia	The Croatian prime minister Andrej Plenković tweeted: "We condemn Russia's recognition of the self-proclaimed regions of Donetsk and Luhansk, which is a violation of international law and the territorial integrity of #Ukraine. Together with (European Union) partners, we express our solidarity with @ZelenskyyUa and (Ukraine) people."
Cyprus	"In light of developments in Ukraine, the Ministry of Foreign Affairs of the Republic of Cyprus reiterates its support to the sovereignty, independence and territorial integrity of Ukraine within its internationally recognized borders."
Czech Republic	Numerous Czech officials have denounced President Putin's decision to recognize the independence of the breakaway Ukrainian republics of Donetsk and Luhansk as a "breach of the Minsk Agreements and international law". The Czech Foreign Ministry said the step was a flagrant violation of the sovereignty and integrity of Ukraine. Prime Minister Petr Fiala stated that the Czech Republic stands firmly behind a free and independent Ukraine and knows from its own historic experience that such steps never lead to peace.
Denmark	Prime Minister of Denmark Mette Frederiksen posted statement on Twitter: "Russia's decision to recognize the so-called DNR and LNR regions of Ukraine as independent is a blatant violation of Ukraine's sovereignty and international law. Denmark condemns the decision, which will not go unanswered. We stand side by side with Ukraine"
Estonia	"Foreign Minister Eva-Maria Liimets: our support for Ukraine's sovereignty and territorial integrity is unwavering".
Finland	The Office of the Finnish president Sauli Niinistö: "Finland condemns Russia's unilateral acts that violate Ukraine's sovereignty and territorial integrity. The recognition of the separatist regions in Eastern Ukraine is a serious breach of the Minsk agreements. Finland responds to Russia's acts as part of the European Union."
France	Hours after recognition, the French president Emmanuel Macron who proposed a summit between Biden and Putin in the light of the 2021–2022 Russo-Ukrainian crisis, condemned the recognition and demanded sanctions.
Georgia	President of Georgia Salome Zourabichvili posted statement on Twitter: "Georgia strongly condemns Russia's « recognition » of Ukraines's Donetsk and Lugansk regions, repeating the scenario that led to the occupation of 20% of our territory. Georgia stands by you Pdt Zelensky and in support of Ukraine's territorial integrity and peace."
Germany	German chancellor Olaf Scholz condemned the recognition of the two regions, which it would be a "one-sided breach" of the Minsk agreement, which tamed the hostilities in the Donbas region.
Greece	The Greek Ministry of Foreign Affairs has stated: "Russia's recognition of the illegal and unilateral declaration of "independence" of Ukraine's separatist regions of Donetsk and Luhansk constitutes a blatant violation of fundamental principles of International Law, Ukraine's territorial integrity, and the Minsk agreements."
Guatemala	The Government of Guatemala on Tuesday expressed its condemnation of the "unilateral recognition" by Russia "of the separatist republics" of Donetsk and Lugansk in Ukraine, announced last Monday by President Vladimir Putin.
Honduras	Honduran foreign ministry has urged involved parties in the crisis to find the way out through dialogue. Honduran Foreign Ministry also underlines the importance of Ukraine in peaceful coexistence in Europe and call other powers not to intervene in Ukraine and defend international system based on international law which respect sovereignty and territorial integrity of Ukraine.
Hungary	The Prime Minister of Hungary Viktor Orbán assured of Hungary's continued support for Ukraine's sovereignty and territorial integrity. He added that Hungary will support the European Union's joint efforts to settle the conflict.
Iceland	The Prime Minister of Iceland Katrín Jakobsdóttir stated on Twitter: "The escalation by Russia in Ukraine is devastating and I am concerned for innocent civilians in the region. This is an unacceptable violation of international law. Escalation and armed conflict is not the solution to current challenges. The door for diplomacy must remain open."
Indonesia	Indonesian president Joko Widodo said that he agreed with the UN Secretary General and asked to cease tension in Ukraine as soon as possible, urge both sides to restraint and will never allow the war to happen. Foreign ministry spokesperson Teuku Faizasyah stated that Indonesia firmly follow the UN charter and international law about territorial integrity of a nation and condemn every move that clearly violates territorial integrity and sovereignty of a nation.
Ireland	Irish Minister for Foreign Affairs Simon Coveney: "Ireland's support for Ukraine's sovereignty and territorial integrity within its internationally recognised borders and its right to choose its own foreign and security policy path is unwavering. The decision by the Russian Federation to proceed with the recognition of the non-government controlled areas of the Donetsk and Luhansk oblasts of Ukraine as independent entities contravenes international law, is a blatant violation of Ukraine's territorial integrity, and marks a clear and unilateral breach of the Minsk agreements. Ireland supports a clear and strong EU response, including additional sanctions measures."
Israel	The Ministry of Foreign Affairs Yair Lapid shares the concern of the international community regarding the steps taken in eastern Ukraine and the serious escalation in the situation. Israel hopes for a diplomatic solution which will lead to calm, and is willing to help if asked. Israel supports the territorial integrity and the sovereignty of Ukraine.
Italy	Italian foreign minister Luigi Di Maio through the Ministry of Foreign Affairs and International Cooperation condemned the decision of the Russian authorities to recognize the so-called separatist republics of Luhansk and Donetsk as in violation to the Minsk agreement. Since 2016, the DPR and the LPR have unofficial representation offices in Italy (Turin, Verona and Messina), that are not recognized by Italian authorities.
Japan	Japanese prime minister Fumio Kishida condemned Russian recognition of Donetsk and Luhansk independence calling it violation of Ukrainian sovereignty. Foreign Minister Yoshimasa Hayashi said Japan will work with international community, including G7 to impose tough measure against Russia.
Kazakhstan	Pending a meeting of the Kazakh security council, the foreign affairs minister stated, "I must assure you: there is no question of Kazakhstan's recognition of the Donetsk and Lugansk People's Republics. We proceed from the foundations of international law and the basic principles of the UN Charter." On 17 June 2022, during a public discussion at the 25th St. Petersburg International Economic Forum, President of Kazakhstan Kassym-Jomart Tokayev stated that Kazakhstan would not recognise what he called "quasi-state territories" in Donetsk and Luhansk.
Kenya	Kenyan UN representative Martin Kimani stated that Kenya and many African nations had been "birthed" with the end of colonialism and had not been able to set their own borders in a statement condemning Russia's recognition. But instead of pursuing states based on “ethnic, racial or religious homogeneity”, which carried the risk of decades of "bloody wars", the countries "agreed that we would settle for the borders we inherited. Rather than form nations that looked ever backwards into history with a dangerous nostalgia, we chose to look forward to a greatness none of our many nations and peoples had ever known," he said.
Kyrgyzstan	The Minister of Foreign Affairs of Kyrgyzstan stated that Kyrgyzstan is a firm supporter of compliance with the universally recognized norms and principles of international law laid down in the UN Charter and other documents, including the territorial integrity of states and the peaceful resolution of conflicts. At the same time, the importance of observing the principle of indivisibility of security was emphasized.
Latvia	The Government of Latvia has condemned the recognition in the following statement: "While utterly condemning Russia's actions, Latvia urges the international community to take the strongest possible measures to stop Russia's aggression and offer assistance to Ukraine. ... We, the President, the Speaker of the Saeima, the Prime Minister, and the Minister of Foreign Affairs of Latvia, on behalf of the people of Latvia, stand in solidarity with the Ukrainian people and offer our unwavering support for Ukraine's freedom, sovereignty and territorial integrity".
Liechtenstein	The Ministry of Foreign Affairs stated on Twitter: "Liechtenstein is deeply concerned about the recognition of certain parts of the Ukrainian regions Luhansk and Donezk by the Government of Russia, in flagrant violation of the territorial integrity and sovereignty of Ukraine, the Minsk agreements endorsed by the United Nations Security Council, as well as the Charter of the United Nations and the rules governing the conduct of international relations. Liechtenstein expresses its solidarity with the people and Government of Ukraine and calls for a peaceful settlement of all issues through diplomatic means and in accordance with international law."
Lithuania	The Ministry of Foreign Affairs of Lithuania strongly condemns Russia's decision to recognize two areas in Ukraine's Luhansk and Donetsk regions, which are held by Russian-backed separatists, as independent. "This decision constitutes a gross violation of the principles enshrined in the Charter of the United Nations and international law, the Helsinki Final Act, and the Charter of Paris".
Luxembourg	The prime minister of Luxembourg Xavier Bettel has posted a statement on Twitter: "I condemn the recent violation of the Minsk agreements by Russia. We will work closely with our EU partners for a united response."
Malta	The Republic of Malta condemns the decision of the Russian Federation to formally recognise the independence of the non-government controlled areas of Donetsk and Luhansk. This decision is a violation of the territorial integrity and sovereignty of Ukraine, is inconsistent with the principles of the Charter of the United Nations, and in breach of the Minsk agreements and undermines the possibility of a diplomatic solution.
Mexico	Permanent Mission of Mexico to the United Nations reiterates its respect for the territorial integrity of Ukraine and the search for a solution through diplomatic channels.
Moldova	President of Moldova Maia Sandu posted statement on Twitter: "We strongly condemn recognition by (Russia) of the separatist areas of Donetsk & Luhansk oblasts of (Ukraine). This is clearly against intl law. (Moldova) remains firmly committed to supporting the sovereignty & territorial integrity of (Ukraine) within its internationally recognized borders."
Montenegro	The Ministry of Foreign Affairs of Montenegro posted a statement on Twitter: "Russia's decision to recognize self-proclaimed "People's Republics" of Donetsk & Luhansk is a violation of Ukraine's sovereignty & territorial integrity, #Minsk agreements & the international law. #Montenegro stands united with the (European Union) and its #NATO allies in support of #Ukraine"
Netherlands	The Minister of Foreign Affairs of the Kingdom of the Netherlands Wopke Hoekstra has stated on Twitter: "The recognition of the separatist territories in #Ukraine is a blatant violation of international law, the territorial integrity of Ukraine, and Minsk agreements. The Netherlands strongly condemns this act and will respond firmly in close coordination with our EU & NATO partners."
New Zealand	The Minister of Foreign Affairs Nanaia Mahuta stated on Twitter: "Aotearoa New Zealand strongly supports Ukraine's sovereignty and territorial integrity. Russia's actions today violate international law and cut across diplomatic efforts to find a peaceful resolution"
North Macedonia	The Foreign Affairs Minister of The Republic of North Macedonia Bujar Osmani has stated on Twitter: "We strongly condemn the recognition by (Russia) of the (Ukraine) areas #Donetsk & #Lugansk as independent. Such acts represent a severe violation of international law. (North Macedonia) reiterates its unequivocal support for sovereignty & territorial integrity of #Ukraine @DmytroKuleba"
Norway	The Norwegian Minister of Foreign Affairs Anniken Huitfeldt has stated that "Norway condemn the Russian declaration of recognizing the self-proclaimed people's republics in Donetsk and Luhansk as independent states", saying that the decision is "another violation of Ukrainian sovereignty". She further stated that "Norway supports Ukraine's independence and territorial integrity in accordance with internationally recognized borders".
Peru	The Peruvian government stated the following: "Peru today expressed its deep concern over the evolution of events inside the Donetsk and Lugansk regions, as well as on the eastern border of Ukraine and Russia, and call for a peaceful and sustainable solution through diplomatic channels". The Permanent Representative of Peru to the UN, Ambassador Manuel Rodriguez Cuadros added: "The recognition of the independence of the separatist territories and the deployment of military forces in these territories are incompatible with the principles of the UN and constitute a violation of the territorial integrity and sovereignty of Ukraine".
Poland	The Polish Foreign Ministry firmly condemned the Russian declaration of two self-proclaimed republics situated on the territory of Ukraine – the so-called "Donetsk People's Republic" and "Luhansk People's Republic" and stated Russia has violated the Minsk Agreement. Polish government expressed its solidarity with Ukraine and urge Russia to cease its illegal actions that breached international laws.
Portugal	The prime minister of Portugal António Costa posted a statement on Twitter: "Russian recognition of the two breakaway Ukraine regions clearly violates the Minsk accords and jeopardizes Ukraine's territorial integrity. We strongly condemn this action and express our full solidarity with Ukraine."
Romania	President of Romania Klaus Iohannis, Prime Minister of Romania Nicolae Ciucă and other relevant Romanian political figures such as Ludovic Orban and Kelemen Hunor condemned Russia's decision to recognize the two separatist republics of Donetsk and Luhansk. Furthermore, Iohannis described the event as a serious violation of international law.
Serbia	Serbian president Aleksandar Vučić stated in an interview that Putin's decision to recognize the breakaway republics put Serbia "in a difficult position". The Serbian government supports Ukraine's sovereignty and territorial integrity, but opposes sanctions against Russia.
Singapore	The MFA Spokesperson said: "Singapore is gravely concerned at the escalation of tensions at the Ukraine-Russia border and the Russian decision to recognise two breakaway Ukrainian regions. The sovereignty, independence and territorial integrity of Ukraine must be respected. All parties concerned should continue to pursue dialogue, including diplomatic means, towards a peaceful settlement of the dispute, in accordance with international law, and avoid action that will further raise tensions in the region."
Slovakia	The Slovak Foreign Ministry firmly does not recognize the self-proclaimed independence of the separatist entities. Slovak principled foreign policy position supports the political sovereignty, independence and territorial integrity of Ukraine and universal validity and respect for the principles of international law.
Slovenia	The Slovenian Ministry of Foreign Affairs stated: "Slovenia strongly condemns the decision by President Putin to recognise Donetsk and Luhansk oblasts of Ukraine as independent entities. These hostile measures are a flagrant violation of international law and obligations contained in the Minsk agreements, and will not remain without consequences".
South Korea	The South Korean President Moon Jae-in has urged Russia to respect Ukrainian sovereignty territorial integrity, pledged to work with international community for de-escalation of the situation in the region. Moon also instructed officials to prepare thoroughly to protect South Korean nationals in Ukraine.
Spain	The Spanish Minister of Foreign Affairs, European Union and Cooperation José Manuel Albares posted a statement on Twitter: "The Russian recognition of the separatist territories in eastern Ukraine is a flagrant violation of Ukraine's territorial integrity, the Minsk agreements and international legality. We will respond in close coordination with our partners and allies."
Sweden	The Swedish Foreign Minister Ann Linde posted a statement on Twitter: "Strongly condemn Russia's recognition of the non-government controlled areas of Donetsk and Luhansk oblasts of Ukraine as independent entities. A blatant violation of international law and of the Minsk agreements."
Switzerland	The Swiss Federal Department of Foreign Affairs tweeted: "Russia's recognition of certain areas of the Ukrainian Luhantsk and Donetsk regions as independent states is a flagrant violation of international law, the territorial integrity and sovereignty of Ukraine and the Minsk agreements. Switzerland calls on Russia to uphold its international obligations and to reserve its action."
Turkey	Turkish Foreign Ministry has called Russian recognition of Donetsk and Luhansk are unacceptable and stated it as clear violation of not only the Minsk Agreement but also Ukrainian political unity. Turkey stated it will work with Ukraine preserving its political unity and territorial integrity.
Ukraine	The Ukrainian Ministry of Foreign Affairs has condemned the Russian Federation's decision to recognise the quasi-entities it had created in the "temporarily occupied territories of Ukraine", the breakaway Luhansk and Donetsk People's Republics, as independent states.
United Kingdom	British Foreign Minister Liz Truss condemned the Russian move shortly after the declaration of recognition of Donetsk and Luhansk and has urged Russia to end its pattern of destabilising behaviour against Ukraine. Truss also stated that the British government will announce a new sanctions against Russia shortly for its destabilising activities in the region. Prime Minister Boris Johnson called Putin's move as "ill omen" and "flagrant breach of sovereignty", Johnson later called the COBR meeting to discuss the situation in Ukraine
United States	On the same day of Putin's announcement, the president of the United States Joe Biden signed Executive Order 13660, swiftly imposing sanctions that target the two Russia-backed breakaway republics in eastern Ukraine. The order, from a statement by White House secretary Jen Psaki, bars "new investment, trade and financing by U.S. persons to, from, or in" the so-called Donetsk People's Republic and Luhansk People's Republic, located in Ukraine's eastern Donbas region, and provides authority to impose sanctions on "any person determined to operate in those areas of Ukraine".
Uruguay	Uruguayan Foreign Ministry is following with great concern the increase in tensions on the border between Ukraine and Russia, which have escalated rapidly after the recognition of two separatist regions in Ukraine by Russia and the displacement of military troops, in violation of the principles of the Charter of the United Nations.
Uzbekistan	On 17 March 2022, foreign minister of Uzbekistan Abdulaziz Kamilov said that Uzbekistan doesn't recognise the breakaway regions and he also announced that the two separatist regions, including Crimea, are part of Ukraine.

==== Non-UN states ====
State	Notes
Kosovo	Kosovo's Ministry of Foreign Affairs expressed solidarity with Ukraine against Russian aggression, stating that Putin has waged war against democracy. Kosovo also urged the free world to respond to Putin and his proxies with resolve.
Taiwan (Republic of China)	The ROC's Ministry of Foreign Affairs expressed "deep regret and condemnation" towards Russia after it ordered troops into the two separatist pro-Moscow regions in eastern Ukraine. The ROC's presidential and Executive Yuan spokeswoman Kolas Yotaka said it was "encouraging" that UN ambassadors were rejecting Russia's claims to Ukrainian territory, saying she looked forward to the day "the world will equally reject" the PRC's claims over Taiwan.
Transnistria	When the Minister of Foreign Affairs of Transnistria Vitaly Ignatiev was asked in a 2022 interview if Transnistria would take measures to organize cooperation with the DPR and the LPR, or if mutual recognition between Transnistria and the two entities would take place, he replied that "we are not working in this direction".

==== International and regional organizations ====
Organization	Notes
European Union	The European Union's top officials condemned the recognition of the Donetsk and Luhansk People's Republics by Russia, calling it a "blatant violation of international law." In a joint statement, European Council President Charles Michel and European Commission President Ursula von der Leyen condemned “in the strongest possible terms the decision by the Russian President to proceed with the recognition of the non-government controlled areas of Donetsk and Luhansk oblasts of Ukraine as independent entities.” The next day, the EU sanctioned 351 members of the State Duma for supporting the independence of the two regions.
NATO	NATO's Secretary General Jens Stoltenberg condemned Russia's decision to extend recognition to the self-proclaimed republics of Donetsk and Luhansk, stating: "This further undermines Ukraine's sovereignty and territorial integrity, erodes efforts towards a resolution of the conflict, and violates the Minsk agreements, to which Russia is a party." The alliance supported the sovereignty and territorial integrity of Ukraine within its internationally recognized borders, with its allies urging Russia to "choose the path of diplomacy, and to immediately reverse its massive military build-up in and around Ukraine, and withdraw its forces from Ukraine in accordance with its international obligations and commitments."
OSCE	The OSCE does not recognize the breakaway republics, and refers to them as "illegally armed groups in Donbas", and to their occupied territories as "certain areas of Donetsk and Luhansk regions" or "CADLR". An OSCE report on war crimes implies that they are not "independent States" nor "simply co-belligerents of Russia", refers to their status as "self-proclaimed 'republics'", Russia's "proxies", and "under overall control of Russia", and states that therefore Russia is responsible for their conduct in the commission of crimes against international humanitarian law.
United Nations	UN Secretary General António Guterres condemned Russia's decision to recognize the independence of two Ukraine's breakaway regions, calling it a violation of the territorial and sovereign integrity of Ukraine and a "death blow" to the Minsk agreements. Guterres also slammed Russia's decision to send "peacekeeping forces" to the region, saying: "When troops of one country enter the territory of another country without its consent, they are not impartial peacekeepers. They are not peacekeepers at all."

== See also ==
- 2014 Donbas status referendums
- Russian invasion of Ukraine
- Russian annexation of Crimea
- International recognition of Abkhazia and South Ossetia
- Reactions to the Russian invasion of Ukraine
- List of states with limited recognition
