= Foreign relations of the Donetsk People's Republic =

Foreign relations of the Donetsk People's Republic may refer to:

- Donetsk People's Republic–Russia relations
- Donetsk People's Republic–South Ossetia relations
