= Western Balkans Quad =

Western Balkans Quad WB QUAD
- Type: Intergovernmental organization
- Membership: Albania; Kosovo; Montenegro; North Macedonia

Establishment
  - Founded: 29 March 2023

The Western Balkans Quad (WB QUAD) is an initiative launched in March 2023 by four Western Balkan countries, Albania, Kosovo, Montenegro and North Macedonia, to support policy alignment with the European Union's Common Foreign and Security Policy.

== History ==
The initiative was founded on 29 March 2023 in Skopje, North Macedonia by Minister of Foreign Affairs of North Macedonia Bujar Osmani, Deputy Minister of Foreign Affairs and Diaspora of Kosovo, Kreshnik Ahmeti, Minister for Europe and Foreign Affairs of Albania, Olta Xhaçka, and the advisor for Foreign Policy of Montenegro, George Radulovic. All four founding members aspire to join the European Union.

At the official launch, Osmani stated that "After the Russian aggression on Ukraine, alignment with the CFSP, but even beyond that, with the positions and values of the democratic world, has become one of the most important priorities of the aspiring EU member states, but also as a clear message for where these countries belong".

Bosnia and Herzegovina and Serbia did not join the new initiative. Bosnia and Herzegovina was unable to join following objections from its Republika Srpska entity. Serbia has not joined due to unwillingness to implement US and EU sanctions against Russia following its 2022 invasion of Ukraine.

=== Meetings ===
No	Date	Host country	Host city	Chair
1	29 March 2023	North Macedonia	Skopje	Bujar Osmani

== Aims ==
The aim of the initiative is to facilitate participating states' alignment of their foreign policy with the European Union's Common Foreign and Security Policy particularly in regard to the energy crisis, economic consequences caused by Russia's invasion of Ukraine and hybrid threats they face. The initiative's strapline is "100% alignment with EU Common Foreign Security Policy."

== Members ==
At launch, the WB QUAD had four founding members:

- Albania
- Kosovo
- Montenegro
- North Macedonia

== See also ==
- Potential enlargement of the European Union
  - Accession of Albania to the European Union
  - Accession of Kosovo to the European Union
  - Accession of Montenegro to the European Union
  - Accession of North Macedonia to the European Union
- South-East European Cooperation Process
- Berlin Process
- Open Balkan
