= Crvenkovski =

Crvenkovski (Macedonian: Црвенковски) is a Macedonian surname. Notable people with the surname include:

- Branko Crvenkovski (born 1962), President of the Republic of Macedonia
- Krste Crvenkovski (1921–2001), Yugoslavian communist leader
- Stevo Crvenkovski (1947–2004), Macedonian diplomat
