= Andonovski =

Andonovski is a surname. Notable people with the surname include:

- Petar Andonovski (born 1987), Macedonian writer
- Vasile Andonovski (born 1961), diplomat of North Macedonia
- Venko Andonovski (born 1964), Macedonian playwright, critic etc.
- Vlatko Andonovski (born 1976), Macedonian-American association football manager and former player
