= Acevski =

Acevski (Ацевски), also in the feminine form Acevska (Ацевска), is a Macedonian surname. Notable people with the surname include:

- Lou Acevski (born 1977), Macedonian footballer
- Ljubica Acevska, Macedonian diplomat
