= List of diplomatic missions of the Donetsk People's Republic =

The Donetsk People's Republic (DPR) is a disputed entity in eastern Ukraine's Donetsk Oblast. The DPR historically sought to be recognised as independent after breaking away from Ukraine but was annexed by Russia on 30 September 2022. The status is now as an unrecognised Russian republic.

The DPR is closely linked to the Luhansk People's Republic (LPR), which has a nearly identical political status and history of formation.

The DPR has foreign relations with Russia, North Korea, and Syria, as of July 2022. The DPR also maintains relations with South Ossetia and Abkhazia, two breakaway states that are claimed by Georgia. The DPR and LPR mutually recognise each other.

== Foreign relations of the Donetsk People's Republic ==
- Russia – Donetsk People's Republic–Russia relations
- South Ossetia – Donetsk People's Republic–South Ossetia relations
  - Representative Office of South Ossetia, Donetsk

== Embassies of the Donetsk People's Republic ==
- Russia – in 2014, the DPR opened a Representative Office in Moscow

- (Autonomous Republic of Crimea) Crimea – in 2016, DPR sympathizers opened a Representative Office in Simferopol

- South Ossetia – in 2015, a DPR Representative Office opened in Tskhinvali

== See also ==
- List of states with limited recognition
