= Timčo Mucunski =

Macedonian politician

- Тимчо Муцунски
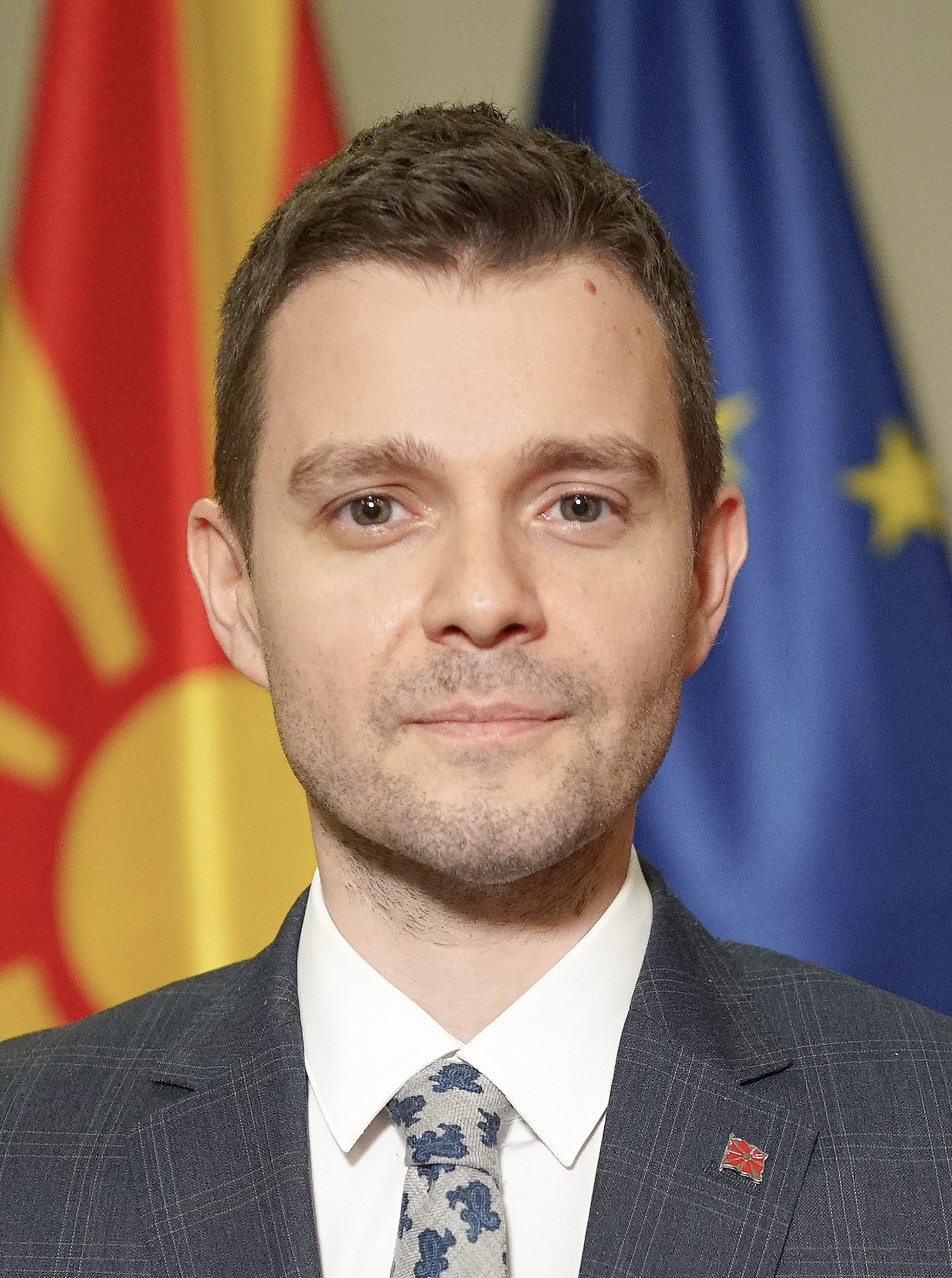
- Mucunski in 2024

Minister of Foreign Affairs
- Incumbent
- Assumed office 23 June 2024
- Prime Minister: Hristijan Mickoski
- Preceded by: Bujar Osmani

Mayor of Aerodrom Municipality
- In office 2021–2024
- Preceded by: Zlatko Marin

Member of the Assembly of North Macedonia
- In office 2020–2021

Personal details
- Born: 29 July 1989 (age 37) Berovo, SR Macedonia, Yugoslavia
- Party: VMRO-DPMNE
- Education: Ss. Cyril and Methodius University in Skopje
- Occupation: Politician

Timčo Mucunski (Macedonian: Тимчо Муцунски; born July 29, 1989) is a Macedonian politician who serves as the Minister of Foreign Affairs of North Macedonia and a university professor. He is the incumbent vice-president of the right-wing political party VMRO-DPMNE. He served as Deputy Minister of Information Society and Public Administration in the Government of the Republic of Macedonia between 2015 and 2017 and as a Member of Parliament between 2020 and 2021.

== Biography ==
Timčo Mucunski was born on 29 July 1989 in Berovo, SR Macedonia, SFR Yugoslavia, now in North Macedonia. He attended Lisgar Collegiate Institute in Ottawa, Canada for high school, and graduated there in June 2006.

In June 2009, he received his Bachelor of Laws (LL.B.) from the Faculty of Law “Iustinianus Primus”, Ss. Cyril and Methodius University of Skopje. After receiving his bachelor's degree, he enrolled in the LL.M. Program in administrative law and public administration at the Faculty of Law “Iustinianus Primus”, University of Ss. Cyril and Methodius where he successfully defended his master's thesis on 4 July 2011. In 2019 he defended his PhD at the Faculty of Law “Iustinianus Primus”, Ss. Cyril and Methodius University of Skopje.

From 2009 to 2015, he was a junior teaching associate at the Faculty of Law “Iustinianus Primus”, Ss. Cyril and Methodius University in Skopje, and from 2015 to 2019 he was a research and teaching assistant at the same institution. As of 2019, he is an assistant professor of law at the same institution.

He has co-authored two university textbooks, published by the Faculty of Law “Iustinianus Primus”, Ss. Cyril and Methodius University in Skopje: Corporate Governance (published in 2014), and Gambling Law (published in 2013), as well as over 20 scientific and expert papers in the field of legal sciences, many of which have been published in well-known academic journals.

Between 11 November 2015 and 22 June 2017, Timčo Mucunski served as Deputy Minister of Information Society and Public Administration in the Cabinets of Nikola Gruevski and Emil Dimitriev.

As of 2018, he is the international secretary of the political party VMRO-DPMNE.

At the 2020 North Macedonian parliamentary election, he was elected to the Assembly of North Macedonia, representing Electoral Unit 1 which encompasses most of the city of Skopje. While serving in the Assembly, he chaired the Parliamentary Committee on Finance and Budget.

In 2021, he was elected as mayor of the Aerodrom Municipality.

In 2024, he was elected as Minister of Foreign Affairs and Foreign Trade.

In 2025 the World Economic Forum recognized Mucunski as a Young Global Leader.

Political offices
Preceded by Bujar Osmani	Minister of Foreign Affairs; 2024–	Incumbent
