= Ljubomir Frčkoski =

Macedonian diplomat

- Љубомир Фрчкоски
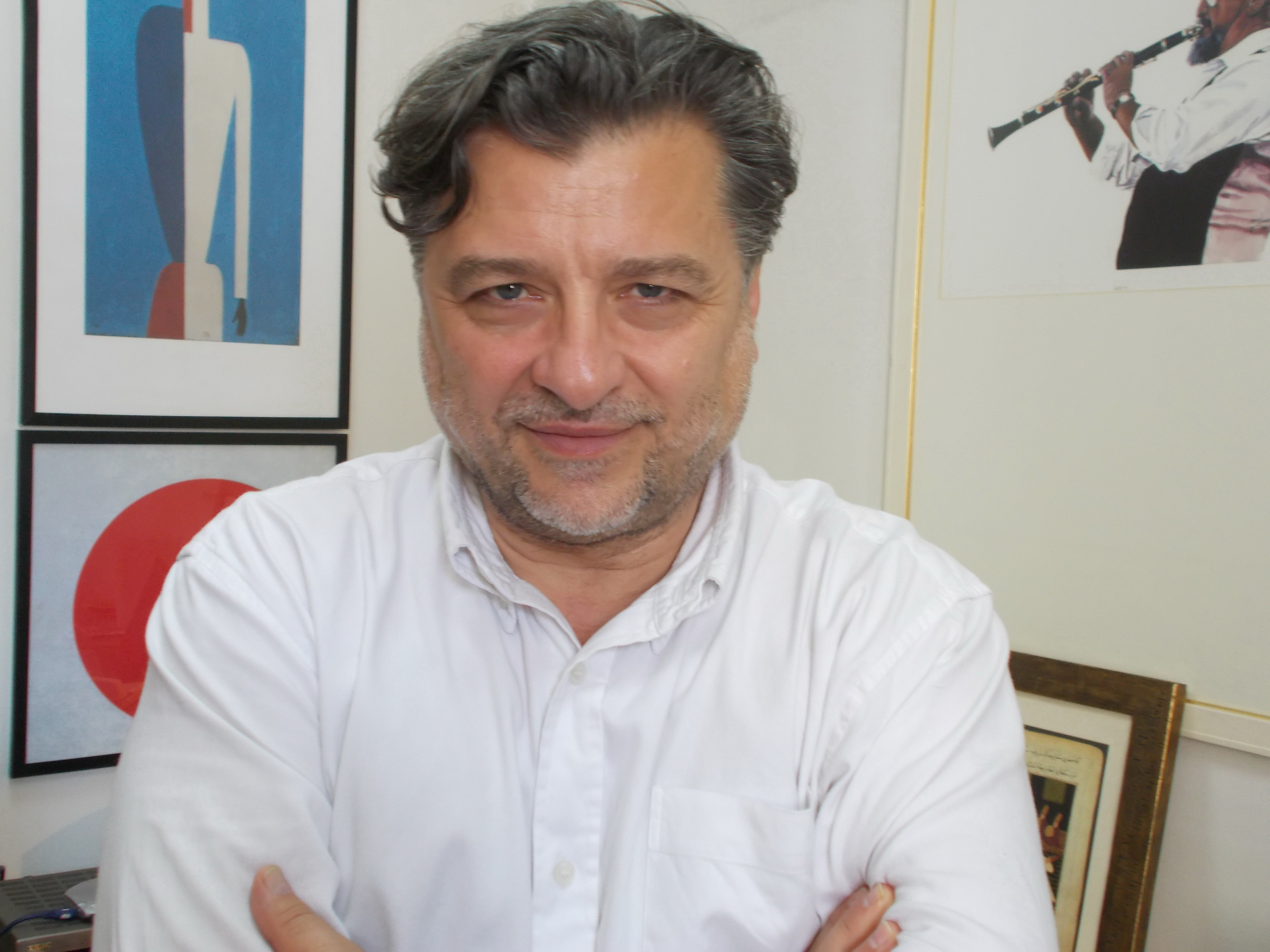
- Frčkoski in 2018

2nd Minister of Interior
- In office 10 January 1992 – 23 February 1996
- President: Branko Crvenkovski
- Preceded by: Jordan Mijalkov
- Succeeded by: Tomislav Cokrevski

2nd Minister of Foreign Affairs
- In office 23 February 1996 – 29 May 1997
- President: Branko Crvenkovski
- Preceded by: Stevo Crvenkovski
- Succeeded by: Blagoj Handziski

Personal details
- Born: 12 December 1957 (age 68) Skopje, SR Macedonia, Yugoslavia (now North Macedonia)
- Party: SDSM
- Education: University of Ljubljana (Ph.D.)
- Occupation: Professor

Ljubomir Danailov Frčkoski (Macedonian: Љубомир Данаилов Фрчкоски-Фрчко; born 12 December 1957) is a Macedonian diplomat who is current Permanent Representative of North Macedonia to the United Nations and a full-time professor at the Faculty of Law "Iustinianus Primus" (Ss. Cyril and Methodius, Skopje, North Macedonia) in Public International Law, Contemporary Political Sciences and Negotiation in Identity conflicts.

Beside his academic career, professor Frčkoski was also active in Macedonian politics as a politician and one of the most influential public intellectuals. The major work in the political field is being involved as an expert in the preparation of the new Constitution of North Macedonia (adopted on 17.11.1991). He was founder (under auspices of Macedonian President Kiro Gligorov) of the first Macedonian Intelligence Agency in 1995. (later in 2020. renamed as Intelligence Agency of North Macedonia).

== Biography ==
Professor Frčkoski graduated at "Iustinianus Primus" in 1981. In 1986 at the same Faculty he completed the master studies, working on a thesis about theoretical perspectives on social-democracy. He obtained his doctoral degree at the University of Ljubljana in the area of political sciences in 1989, working on topics related to democracy. His doctoral dissertation afterwards was published under the title Theories of Democracy. During his academic career has been engaged as a guest lecturer widely in Europe and North America, and was a visiting professor for ten years in Italy at the second cycle study/master program of the International Institute for European Studies (IUIES), where he was also a member of the scientific committee. He was also engaged as a visiting professor at Università degli studi Internazionali di Roma. His latest engagement (May 2018) as a visiting professor was at The Russian Presidential Academy of National Economy and Public Administration (RANEPA).

Frčkoski has participated at numerous scientific events dedicated to different topics, but mainly concentrated on human rights, international law, political theory, nationalism, psychoanalysis. At one of the last conferences where he participated, at the University of Leeds, Conference for Interdisciplinary Approaches to Politics (2016), he presented his latest work with intertwining psychoanalysis and political theory and political philosophy discussing the issue of nationalism. This phase of his work is elaborated in details in his book Restless Nationalism. And in the forthcoming Human Rights and Psychoanalysis (to be published autumn, 2018), he is developing the contemporary critique of human rights via the categories of psychoanalysis, following the Lacanian tradition and Slavoj Žižek's interpretation.

As a scientific coordinator, professor Frčkoski is working on the ongoing project "Critical Re-examination of Law" at the Faculty of Law "Iustinianus Primus". The project is focusing on the contemporary critique of law, within differently organized methodological and content approaches parted in four parts.

Beside being active in the academia, he participated in the work of some international organizations as the European Commission against Racism and Discrimination (2002-2007), the French Institute for International Relations (from 1994), the International Institute for Middle East and Balkan Studies (from 2016).

From 1997 onwards, Frčkovski was active as a columnist in some Macedonian newspapers, such as Дневник and Време.

== Selected bibliography of published works ==
1. Public International Law (textbook, monograph), Tabernakul, Skopje, 1994
2. International Legal Reaction to Organized Crime, Bezbednost, 1995 and Plus 208/209/210, 1995
3. Minorities and Self-Determination, Balkan forum, 1996 (Plus, 1996)
4. The Model of Interethnic Relations in the Republic of Macedonia (1990-1997), Krug, 1999
5. How to Adapt Multicultural Society to Democracy, Osteuropa – Institut, Munich – Berlin, 2000
6. Macedonia and the Region, Chaillot Papers 46, 2001 Institute for Security Studies, WEU - Paris
7. International Law on Human Rights (textbook, monograph), Foundation Institute Open Society Macedonia, 2001
8. Macedonia: A Stabile Model of Interethnic Relations, ELIAMEP, 2001
9. EU Policy: Between Principles and Balkan Practice, Venetian Commission (UNIDEM), Council of Europe, 2001
10. Byzantium Globalization vis-à-vis Globalization of Today (“Justinian’s Codification and Modern Law”), Ohrid, 2003
11. Contemporary Political Theories (textbook), Forum, Skopje, 2003
12. International Law on Human Rights (textbook, monograph), second supplemented issue, Magor, Skopje, 2005
13. Trends in International Law State Recognition and the Macedonia Case, Code, Macedonian – French Days of Law, Skopje, Prosvetno delo, 2004
14. Declaring Independence of the Republic of Macedonia, Policy and Procedure, MANU Anthology for 60 years ASNOM, 2005
15. Negotiation in Identity Conflicts, Templum, Skopje, 2007
16. Restless Nationalism, Kultura, Skopje 2016
17. Human Rights and Psychoanalysis, Kultura, Skopje (to be published autumn, 2018)

Diplomatic posts
Preceded by Vasile Andonovski	Permanent Representative of North Macedonia to the United Nations; 2022–present	Incumbent
