= Vasile Andonovski =

Macedonian diplomat

Vasile Andonovski (born 24 December 1961) is a Macedonian diplomat who was a Permanent Representative of the Republic of Macedonia to the United Nations (since 2014).

== Biography ==
Andonovski was born in 1961 and joined the Macedonian foreign service in 1999 after studying journalism and international relations at the Ss. Cyril and Methodius University of Skopje. He first worked in the Department of Analytics of the Ministry of Foreign Affairs until being appointed as the ministry's spokesperson in 2000. Andonovski later worked at the Macedonian embassy in Rome from 2002 to 2006, before becoming deputy head of public diplomacy and an official magazine editor until 2007. He worked as a spokesperson again until 2008 being made the deputy head of mission at the Macedonian embassy in Beijing, China. From 2012 he was in charge of the cabinet of the foreign ministry for public relations, before being assigned as Permanent Representative of the Republic of Macedonia to the UN. In September 2014, Andonovski attended a flag-raising ceremony in New York City, commemorating the Republic of Macedonia's 23 years of independence.

Diplomatic posts
Preceded by Pajo Avirovikj	Permanent Representative of Republic of Macedonia to the United Nations; 2015–2022	Succeeded by Ljubomir Frčkoski
