= Antonio Milošoski =

Macedonian politician (born 1976)

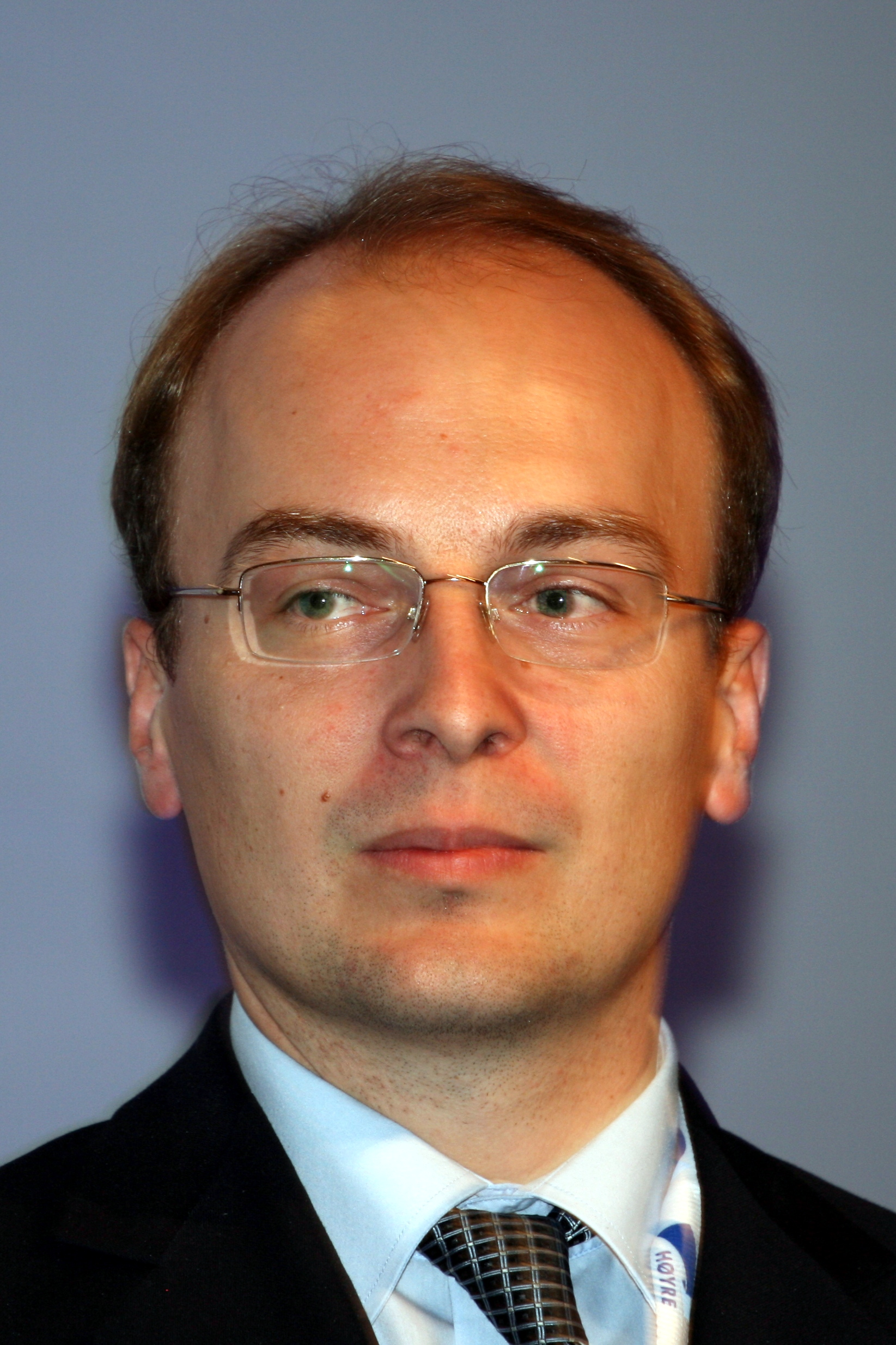
- Milošoski in 2009
- Born: January 29, 1976 (age 50); Tetovo, SR Macedonia, SFR Yugoslavia
- Education: Ss. Cyril and Methodius University in Skopje; University of Bonn
- Occupation: Politician
- Political party: VMRO-DPMNE

Antonio Milošoski (born January 29, 1976) is a Macedonian politician, former minister of foreign affairs of the Republic of Macedonia from 2006 to 2011 and a member of VMRO-DPMNE.

== Early life and education ==
In 1999, Milošoski graduated from the Faculty of Law of Ss. Cyril and Methodius University in Skopje. In 2002, he did his postgraduate studies at the University of Bonn, Germany, and received his Master on European Integration.

He commands four foreign languages — Albanian, English, German and Serbian.

== Career ==
He became foreign minister on 28 August 2006 (replacing Ilinka Mitreva).

He serves as the Head of the OSCE/ODIHR Election Observation Mission for Belarus.

Political offices
Preceded by Ilinka Mitreva	Minister of Foreign Affairs; 2006-2011	Succeeded by Nikola Poposki
