= Nikola Dimitrov =

Macedonian politician and diplomat

- Никола Димитров
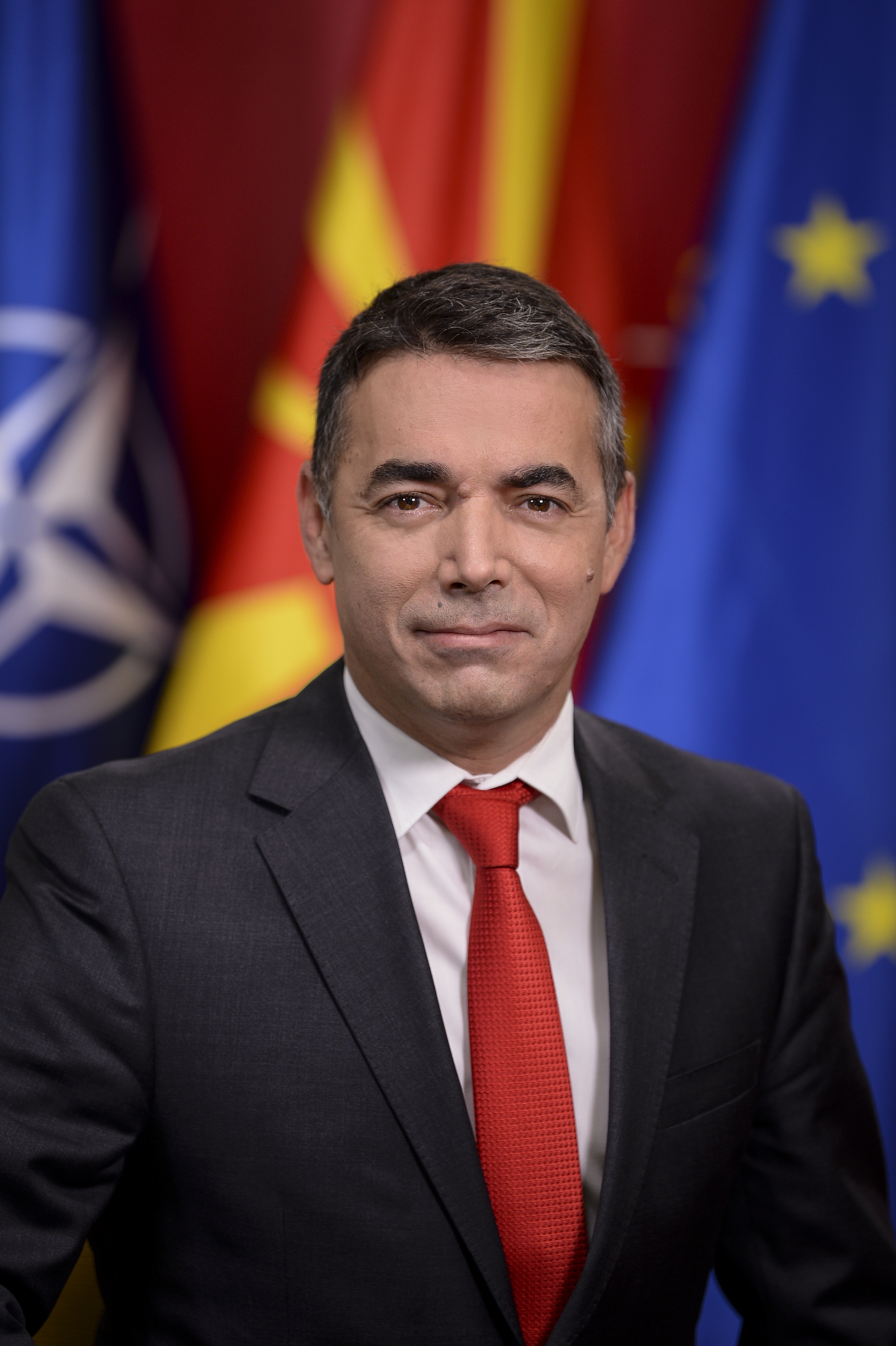
- Official portrait, 2020

Deputy Prime Minister for European Integration (North Macedonia)
- In office 30 August 2020 – 17 January 2022
- Prime Minister: Zoran Zaev
- Preceded by: Bujar Osmani
- Succeeded by: Bojan Maricik

Minister of Foreign Affairs
- In office 31 May 2017 – 30 August 2020
- Prime Minister: Zoran Zaev; Oliver Spasovski
- Preceded by: Nikola Poposki
- Succeeded by: Bujar Osmani

2nd Macedonian Ambassador to the United States
- In office 1 December 2002 – 6 July 2006
- President: Boris Trajkovski; Branko Crvenkovski
- Premier: Branko Crvenkovski; Vlado Bučkovski
- Preceded by: Ljubica Acevska
- Succeeded by: Ljupčo Jordanovski

Personal details
- Born: 30 September 1972 (age 53) Skopje, SR Macedonia, Yugoslavia (now North Macedonia)
- Party: Independent (1996–present)
- Other political affiliations: SDSM (2020–present)
- Education: University of Skopje; King's College, Cambridge

Nikola Dimitrov (born 30 September 1972) is a Macedonian politician and diplomat, who has served as Minister of Foreign Affairs for North Macedonia from 31 May 2017 to 30 August 2020. He also served as Deputy Minister of Foreign Affairs in 2000 and Macedonian ambassador to the United States and then the Netherlands. In 2014, he turned down an appointment as Macedonia's new ambassador to Russia.

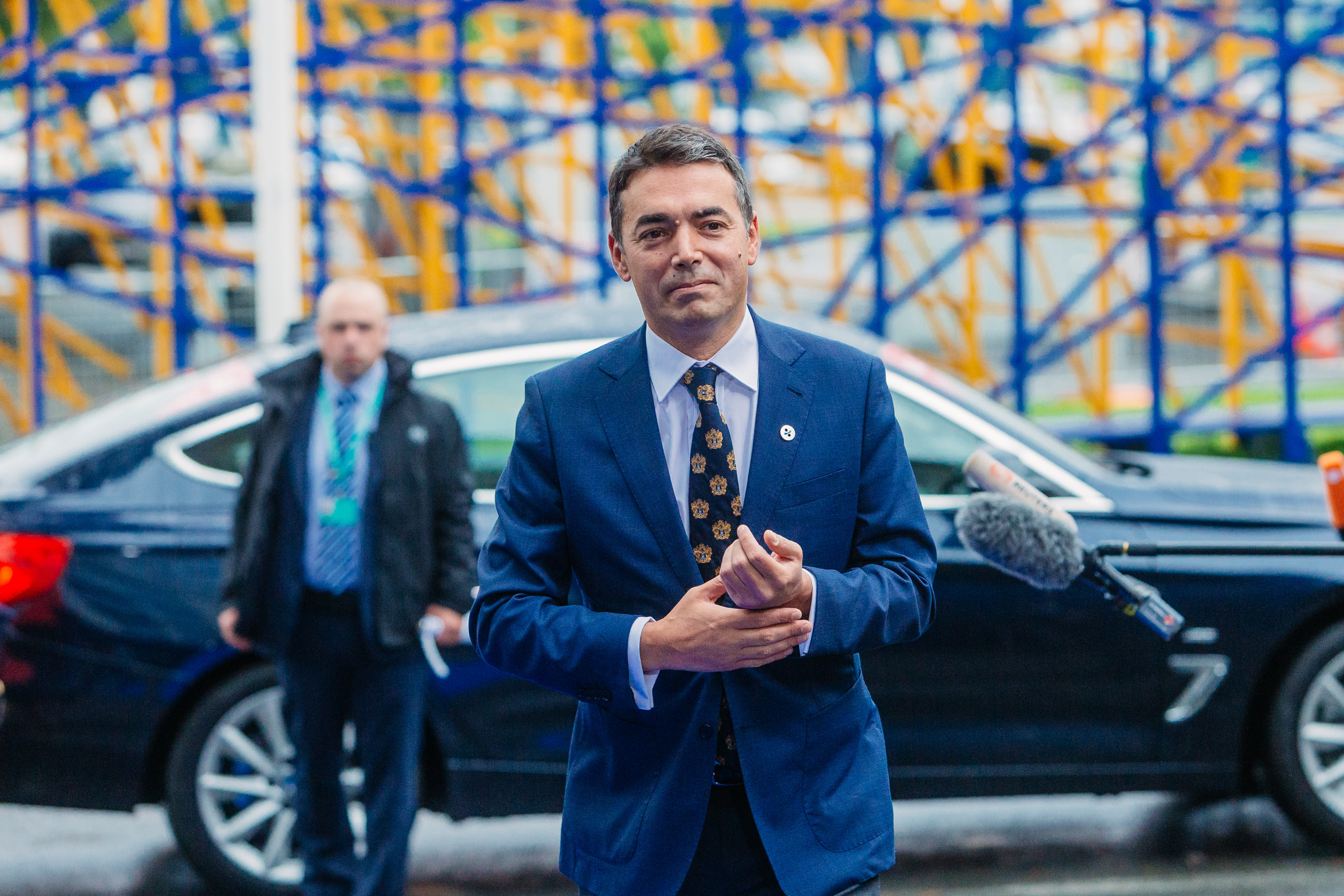
European Informal meeting of ministers for foreign affairs (Gymnich)

Dimitrov, together with his Greek counterpart Nikos Kotzias, signed the Prespa agreement in 2018 in efforts of resolving the Macedonia naming dispute. As a result of this agreement, his country changed its name to North Macedonia.

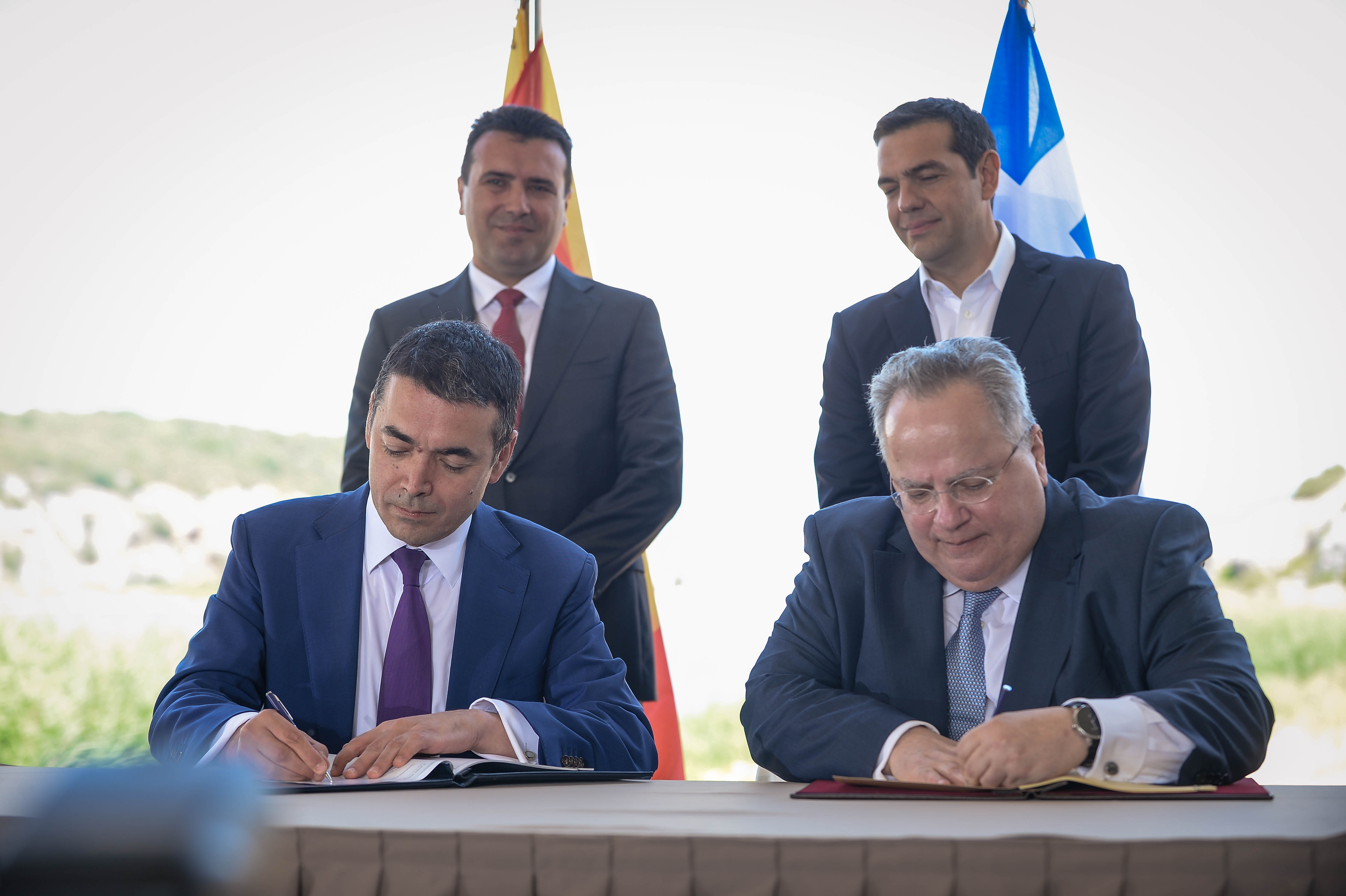
Signed of the Prespa agreement in 2018

== Career ==
Dimitrov started his governmental career in 1996 at the Ministry of Foreign Affairs as an international human rights lawyer, and was promoted to Deputy Minister of Foreign Affairs in 2000. In 2002 he was named the second Macedonian ambassador to the United States, succeeding Ljubica Acevska. This made him the youngest diplomat in Washington, D.C. at the time; this was part of a trend of generational transitions in Eastern European governments: "replac[ing] the old guard with young, Western-educated technocrats".

In October 2009 he took up a new post as Macedonia's ambassador to the Netherlands. After the end of his term there in March 2013, it had originally been planned that he would take up the ambassadorship to Germany, but instead that post went to Nikola Kolev. In February 2014, it was announced that Dimitrov had turned down an appointment as Macedonia's ambassador to Moscow.

Dimitrov was Special Envoy in the talks for overcoming the name differences under the auspices of the United Nations in the period 2003–2008. From 2008 until 2011 he was a co-representative of the then Republic of Macedonia before the International Court of Justice in the case against Greece concerning the interpretation and implementation of the Interim Accord signed by both countries in 1995.

Having been involved in the diplomatic efforts for the name dispute for years, in 2017 he was appointed Minister of Foreign Affairs in the new government led by Zoran Zaev, leader of SDSM, which pledged to solve the disputes with neighboring countries and to improve the cooperation with them. As head of the Macedonian diplomacy, Dimitrov signed the Prespa agreement on 17 June 2018 in a high-level ceremony at the Greek border village of Psarades on Lake Prespa.

He is a former member of The Balkans in Europe Policy Advisory Group.

== Personal life ==
Nikola's father Dimitar Dimitrov is a refugee of the Greek Civil War. Nikola did his LL.B. at the Ss. Cyril and Methodius University of Skopje, and his LL.M at King's College, Cambridge in the United Kingdom, where he specialised in international law. He has been married twice and has three children, two of which are 16 and one 22.

== Awards and honors ==
- EU: On September 9, 2019, Dimitrov received the "EWB Award for the Contribution to the European Integration of the Region" by portal European Western Balkans for "demonstrating extraordinary efforts in bringing his country and the region closer to the EU, promoting the spirit of cooperation and peace in regional affairs, with a special emphasis on normalization of relations between Greece and North Macedonia, as well as an exemplary support for democratic reforms and overcoming the burden of the past in the Western Balkans”.

== See also ==
- List of foreign ministers in 2017
- List of foreign ministers in 2018
- List of foreign ministers in 2019
- List of foreign ministers in 2020

Political offices
Preceded by Nikola Poposki	Minister of Foreign Affairs; 2017–2020	Succeeded by Bujar Osmani
