= Srgjan Kerim =

Macedonian diplomat (born 1948)

- Срѓан Керим
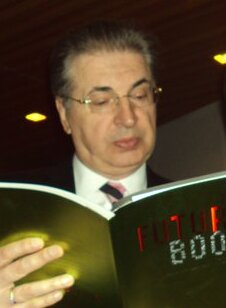
- Kerim in 2011

President of the United Nations General Assembly
- In office 18 September 2007 – 16 September 2008
- Preceded by: Haya Rashed Al-Khalifa
- Succeeded by: Miguel d'Escoto Brockmann

Minister of Foreign Affairs
- In office 30 November 2000 – 13 May 2001
- Prime Minister: Ljubčo Georgievski
- Succeeded by: Ilinka Mitreva

Personal details
- Born: 12 December 1948 (age 77) Skopje, PR Macedonia, FPR Yugoslavia
- Party: VMRO-DPMNE
- Education: University of Belgrade

Srgjan Kerim (Macedonian: Срѓан Керим, pronounced [sr̩'ɟan kɛ'rim]; Turkish: Sercan Kerim; born December 12, 1948) is a Macedonian diplomat, economist, former Foreign Minister and President of the 62nd Session of the United Nations General Assembly. His term of office began on September 18, 2007, and ended on September 16, 2008. He is of Macedonian Turkish descent.

== Education ==
Srgjan Kerim holds a Ph.D. in Economic Sciences from the Faculty of Economics at the University of Belgrade.

== Career ==
=== Academic career ===
Kerim’s academic career started in 1972 at the Faculty of Economics at the University of Belgrade as Assistant and later as Professor in the Department for International Economic Relations. He was also a visiting professor at the University of Hamburg (Germany) and at New York University.

In the course of the last decade he delivered over 100 lectures at international conferences on issues such as globalization, emerging markets, sustainable development, climate change etc. From 2011 until 2014 he was professor of International Economics and International Relations at FON University in Macedonia. He is currently teaching Development of Global Businesses at the South East European University in Macedonia.

=== Political and diplomatic career ===
Between 1976 and 1978 Kerim was a member of the Presidency of the Youth Federation of Yugoslavia and President of the Foreign Policy Committee. In 1986 he was appointed Minister of Foreign Economic Relations in the Government of the Socialist Republic of Macedonia and served in this position until 1989.

Kerim also represented North Macedonia as Ambassador to Germany (1994-2000), to Switzerland and Liechtenstein (1995-2000).

Kerim’s first duty related to multilateral diplomacy was as Advisor to the President of the Sixth Session of the United Nations Conference on Trade and Development (UNCTAD VI), held in 1983 in Belgrade.

From 1988 to 1991, he served as Deputy Minister and Spokesman of the Federal Ministry of Foreign Affairs of the Federal Republic of Yugoslavia in charge of multilateral affairs (including participation in the UN, G-77 and Non-Aligned Movement activities).

In 1990, he was part of the team responsible for preparation and participation at the first OSCE conference on economic cooperation, held in Bonn. He also took part in the negotiations with EU (then EC) on the Association Agreement between Yugoslavia and EU (1989–91).

During his mandate as Macedonian Ambassador to Germany, he also served as Special Envoy of Stability Pact for South Eastern Europe (1999-2000).

From 2000 to 2001, Kerim was Minister of Foreign Affairs of North Macedonia. He then chaired the Southeastern European Cooperation Initiative (2000-2001). During this period North Macedonia signed the Stabilisation and Association Agreement with the EU.

He then became Ambassador and Permanent Representative of North Macedonia to the United Nations (2001-2003). He then served as Vice-chairman both of the International Conference on Financing for Development (Monterrey, 2002) and of the World Summit on Sustainable Development (Johannesburg, 2002). In addition, he was a member of the group of facilitators to the President of the Fifty-sixth UN General Assembly, focusing on UN reform, and was a co-organizer of the Regional Forum on Dialogue Among Civilizations (Ohrid, 2003).

Between 2008 and 2009, he was Special Envoy of the UN Secretary General on Climate Change. Since 2008, Kerim has been a member of the Council of Presidents of the United Nations General Assembly.

=== President of the United Nations General Assembly ===
From 2007 to 2008 Kerim was President of the 62nd Session of the United Nations General Assembly in New York. In his opening at the beginning of the 62nd Session, he outlined five priority issues:

"I have identified: climate change; financing for development and achieving the Millennium Development Goals; countering terrorism; and the reform agenda – to renewing the management, effectiveness and coherence of this organisation."

In July 2008, Kerim declared that it had been estimated that there would "be between 50 million and 200 million environmental migrants by 2010."

== United Nations Secretary-General selection ==
Srgjan Kerim was nominated on 17 September 2015 by the Government of North Macedonia and was the first candidate to officially put forward his name to be the next UN Secretary-General. He has thus far proposed the following priorities for the UN:

Priority 1: Democratic Governance and Reform of the UN

In terms of UN accountability for the cholera outbreak in Haiti, Kerim emphasized the importance of the UN maintaining its authority and reputation by providing full reparations to cholera victims. He skirted UN responsibility for the outbreak by citing lack of organization and issues on the ground in places where the UN provides Peacekeeping.

On the topic of sexual exploitation and abuse by UN peacekeepers, the United States raised a question during UN Secretary General Candidate informal dialogues. Kerim responded to the question on ensuring transparency and accountability by saying that the future SG needs to be "stubborn and not let things go...If there is misunderstanding here and lack of trust here, you must be a trust-builder."

37 human rights organizations recently endorsed a UN Secretary General accountability pledge. This pledge asks the candidates to take action on two human rights violations that have tarnished the United Nations' image: failing to provide remedies for victims of cholera in Haiti, and sexual exploitation and abuse by peacekeepers. Kerim sent a message, responding to Aids Free World and the Institute for Justice & Democracy in Haiti, in which he expressed his "full support for [their] initiative in promoting greater transparency and accountability within the UN system". While he declined to sign onto the pledge, he did pledge to "continue striving for a stronger, more transparent, just, and accountable UN system."

Priority 2: Security

Kerim emphasized diplomatic dialogue and multilateral cooperation as central to addressing security, including counterterrorism.

Priority 3: Sustainable Development and Climate Change

Kerim emphasized that advocating Climate Change and enhancement of Financing for Development (FfD) should be a top priority, as part of the post 2015 sustainable development agenda for global cooperation and partnership.

Priority 4: Gender Equality, Education and Citizen Participation

Kerim called for proportional representation of women across political, social, economic, and cultural governance, and emphasized the connection between gender equality and education.

Priority 5: Migration

Kerim advocated for greater understanding of migration as a historical and ongoing global phenomenon.

Political offices
Preceded by Aleksandar Dimitrov	Minister of Foreign Affairs; 2000–2001	Succeeded by Ilinka Mitreva
Positions in intergovernmental organisations
Preceded by Haya Rashed Al-Khalifa	President of the United Nations General Assembly; 2007–2008	Succeeded by Miguel d'Escoto Brockmann
