= Ilinka Mitreva =

Macedonian politician (1950–2022)

- Илинка Митрева
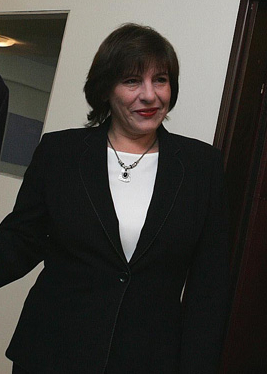
- Mitreva in 2012

Minister of Foreign Affairs of Macedonia
- In office 13 May 2001 – 23 November 2001
- President: Boris Trajkovski
- Prime Minister: Ljubčo Georgievski
- Preceded by: Srgjan Kerim
- Succeeded by: Slobodan Čašule
- In office 1 November 2002 – 28 August 2006
- President: Boris Trajkovski; Ljupčo Jordanovski; Branko Crvenkovski
- Prime Minister: Branko Crvenkovski; Hari Kostov; Vlado Bučkovski
- Preceded by: Slobodan Čašule
- Succeeded by: Antonio Milošoski

Personal details
- Born: 11 February 1950 Skopje, SR Macedonia, SFR Yugoslavia
- Died: 1 August 2022 (aged 72) Skopje, North Macedonia
- Party: Social Democratic Union
- Education: University of Belgrade Faculty of Philology
- Awards: Legion of Honor

Ilinka Mitreva (Macedonian: Илинка Митрева; 11 February 1950 – 1 August 2022) was a Macedonian politician. She was Minister of Foreign Affairs in 2001 and from 2002 to 2006 and represented Macedonia at the Council of Europe.

== Personal life ==
Mitreva was born in Skopje in 1950. She studied a master's degree at the University of Belgrade Faculty of Philology and then received her Doctorate from the Faculty of Philology in Skopje.

From 1974 to 2001 Mitreva worked as a junior assistant, associate professor and head of the Department of Romanian Languages and Literature at the Faculty of Philology in Skopje. Mitreva was professor of French literature at the Department of Romanian Languages and Literature from 23 November 2001 to 31 October 2002. She was the author of several professional and scientific papers.

== Political career ==
In 1994, Mitreva was elected as a Member of Parliament in the Assembly of the Republic of Macedonia with the Social Democratic Union of Macedonia (SDSM), serving until 2002. From 1994 to 1998 she served as head of the parliamentary group of the Republic of Macedonia for cooperation with the European Parliament.

Mitreva was Minister of Foreign Affairs of Macedonia in two different terms. She was first appointed to that position in May 2001, but resigned in November 2001. However, she was reappointed in November 2002, and held the position until August 2006, when a new government took office after parliamentary elections.

Mitreva was Foreign Affairs Minister during a turbulent period in Macedonia. In the role, Mitreva visited Bern for bilateral talks with the Swiss Foreign Minister, Joseph Deiss to discuss fundraising in Switzerland by ethnic Albanians who were involved in the conflict with the Macedonian government.

Mitreva also announced Macedonia's bid for European Union (EU) membership in 2003. She served as "Representative of the former Yugoslav Republic of Macedonia" in Parliamentary Assembly of the Council of Europe from October 2006 to September 2008.

== Awards ==
Mitreva was decorated by the French government three times and received the highest recognition, Knight of the Legion of Honor, in 2021.

== Death ==
Mitreva died on 1 August 2022, aged 72.

Political offices
Preceded by Slobodan Casule	Minister of Foreign Affairs; 2002–2006	Succeeded by Antonio Milososki
Preceded by Srgjan Kerim	Minister of Foreign Affairs; 2001–2001	Succeeded by Slobodan Casule
