= Nikola Poposki =

Macedonian diplomat (born 1977)

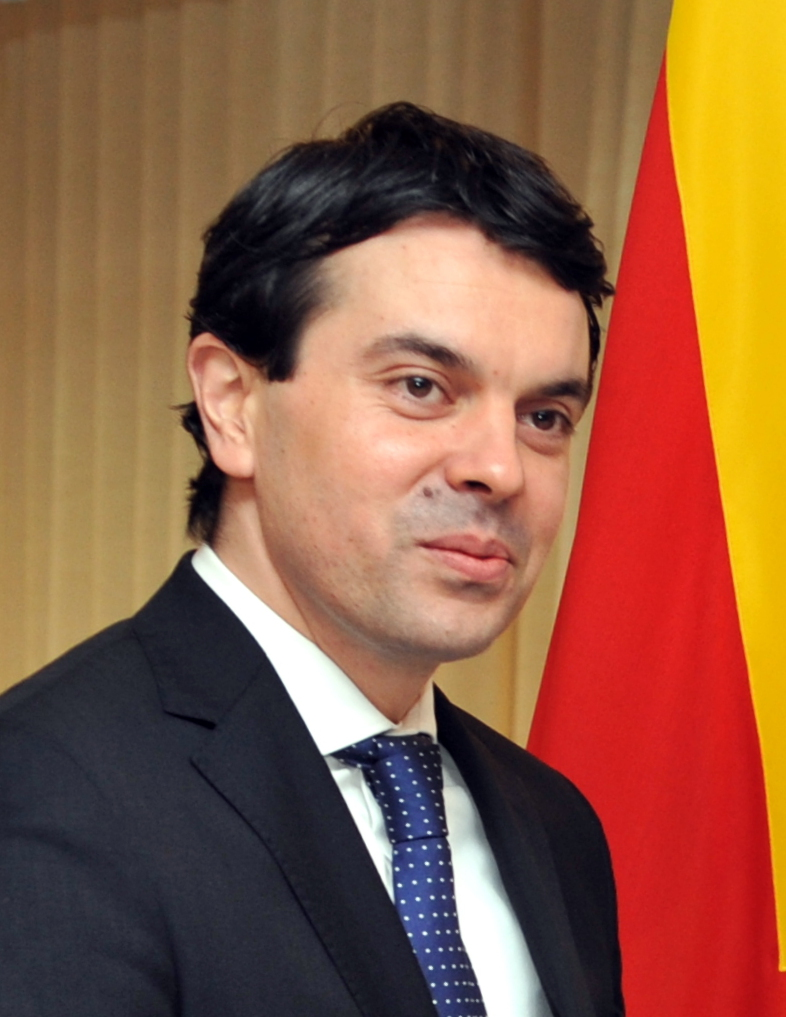

Minister of Foreign Affairs
- In office 28 July 2011 – 31 May 2017
- Prime Minister: Nikola Gruevski
- Preceded by: Antonio Milošoski
- Succeeded by: Nikola Dimitrov

Personal details
- Born: 24 October 1977 (age 48) Skopje, SR Macedonia, SFR Yugoslavia (now North Macedonia)
- Party: VMRO-DPMNE
- Education: University of Skopje; College of Europe

Nikola Poposki (born 24 October 1977 in Skopje) was Minister of Foreign Affairs of the Republic of Macedonia until 31 May 2017. Prior to that role, in 2010–2011 he served as the country's ambassador to the European Union.

== Education ==
Nikola Poposki received a BA in Economics from Skopje University and from Nice University in 2002 and a Master in Languages and International Trade in the EU from Skopje University and Rennes University in 2004. He later received a master's degree from the College of Europe.

== Career ==
=== Foreign policy ===
Speaking to the Israel Council on Foreign Relations in March 2016, Poposki addressed, in his capacity as Foreign Minister, the recent critiques of the international press with regards to his country's handling of the migrant crisis. He stated: "We’re willing to give them humane treatment and safe transit, but no way will we take the burden for problems that the EU is not ready to resolve," referring to the directives demanded of European countries onto Macedonia even though the latter has been refused so far membership to either the European Community or to the North Atlantic Treaty Organization.

== Awards and decorations ==
- 2016: Grand Officer of the Order of the Star of Italian Solidarity

== See also ==
- List of foreign ministers in 2017

Political offices
Preceded by Antonio Milošoski	Minister of Foreign Affairs; 2011–2017	Succeeded by Nikola Dimitrov
