= Luhansk People's Republic–Russia relations =

- Luhansk People's Republic: Russia

Presidential Decree No. 72, dated 21 February 2022, recognizing the independence of the Luhansk People's Republic

Luhansk People's Republic–Russia relations were bilateral relations between Russia and the Luhansk People's Republic (LPR). The LPR was widely internationally unrecognized as a sovereign state. Most of the international community regarded the claimed independent LPR as a Russian military occupation of the portion of Ukraine's Luhansk Oblast they controlled.

Shortly before invading Ukraine, Russia recognized the LPR and Donetsk People's Republic (DPR), another claimed independent but internationally unrecognized breakaway state, also signing treaties of friendship and mutual assistance with them. On 24 February 2022, Russia invaded Ukraine. As the invasion began, Putin gave a speech outlining that the LPR and DPR had requested military assistance, falsely claiming the regions had been facing genocide for eight years, and that under the terms of the treaties and Article 51 of the United Nations Charter, he was authorizing a "special military operation" in Ukraine.

The LPR willingly acceded to annexation by Russia on 30 September 2022, following an illegitimate referendum. The annexation is widely internationally unrecognized, with the majority of the international community still considering the territory of the LPR as part of Ukraine. From April 2014 to September 2022, the LPR portrayed itself as an independent state, and it was widely regarded as a puppet state of Russia by the international community.

== Background ==
The Luhansk People's Republic was proclaimed in April 2014, declaring independence from Ukraine. It was proclaimed in the territory of Ukraine's Luhansk Oblast, in the Donbas region. The LPR separated from Ukraine through military force, with assistance from Russia.

A referendum was held by the newly declared LPR authorities, asking citizens of Luhansk Oblast to agree or disagree to the creation of the new republic. The referendum was deemed illegal by the Ukrainian government and by most governments in Europe, except for Russia.

The Donetsk People's Republic was created in a similar manner in the neighbouring Donetsk Oblast in Ukraine in April 2014. Meanwhile, in February–March 2014, Russia annexed Crimea in southern Ukraine, following a declaration of independence by the "Republic of Crimea".

== LPR–Russia relations ==
=== Unofficial relations (2014–2022) ===
Documents issued by the Donetsk and Luhansk People's Republics have been valid in Russia since 2017. This allowed residents to work, travel, or study in Russia. The head of state, Leonid Pasechnik made a deal with Russia to evacuate citizens to southern parts of Russia.

Ever since Russia has been establishing diplomatic relations with the LPR. Both sides have signed a treaty of friendship, cooperation, military aid and assistance. Russia has given out more than 600,000 Russian passports to the citizens of the republics and has backed the rebels with guns and artillery. Russia also recognizes the Ukrainian-controlled areas as part of the rebels. Russia has also ordered troops to serve as peacekeepers in the separatist-held regions of the Donbas. The LPR was described as a puppet state of Russia, despite Russia not officially recognizing it.

=== Official relations (21 February 2022–30 September 2022) ===
Russia officially recognised the Luhansk People's Republic on February 21, 2022.

On March 27, 2022, the head of LPR Leonid Pasechnik announced plans to hold a referendum on joining Russian Federation.

In late September 2022, Russia held illegitimate annexation referendums on the Ukrainian territory it occupied, including Luhansk. On 30 September 2022 Russia formally annexed the LPR, along with the Donetsk People's Republic, Kherson Oblast and Zaporizhzhia Oblast, with undefined borders. The LPR and DPR were recognised as republics of Russia and now consider themselves formally part of Russia. The international community overwhelmingly rejected the referendums and annexation, with a UN General Assembly resolution condemning them and reaffirming that all four annexed regions remain the sovereign territory of Ukraine passed with 143 in favour, 35 abstaining, and 5 opposed.

== See also ==
- Donetsk People's Republic–Russia relations
- Foreign relations of Russia
