= Ministry of Foreign Affairs (North Macedonia) =

Government ministry of North Macedonia

- Министерство за надворешни работи (Macedonian); Ministria e Punëve të Jashtme (Albanian)
- Logo of Ministry of Foreign Affairs of North Macedonia

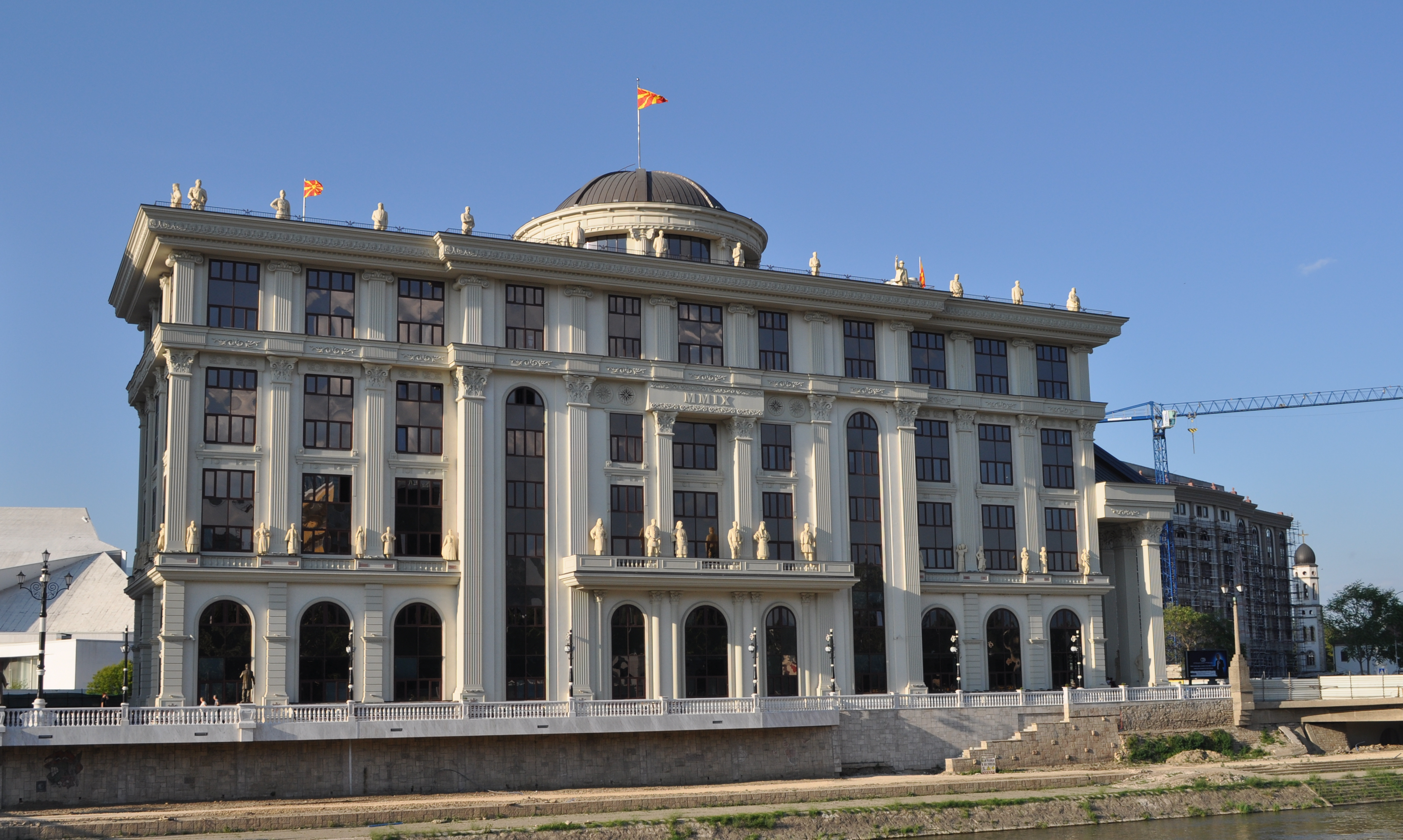
- New building of the Ministry since 2014

Agency overview
- Formed: 1991
- Type: Ministry
- Jurisdiction: Government of North Macedonia
- Headquarters: Philip II of Macedon 7, Skopje, North Macedonia
- Ministers responsible: Timčo Mucunski, Minister of Foreign Affairs; zoran dimitrovski, Deputy Minister of Foreign Affairs; Viktor Dimovski, State secretary of Foreign Affairs
- Website: www.mfa.gov.mk

Ministry of Foreign Affairs of North Macedonia (Macedonian: Министерство за надворешни работи, romanized: Ministerstvo za nadvorešni raboti, Albanian: Ministria e Punëve të Jashtme) is a government department in North Macedonia. Timčo Mucunski serves as the current Minister of Foreign Affairs, since 23 June 2024.

== List of ministers ==
No.	Portrait	Minister (Birth–Death)	Term of office			Political Party
No.	Portrait	Minister (Birth–Death)	Took office	Left office	Time in office	Political Party
1	Denko Maleski	Denko Maleski (born 1945)	20 March 1991	9 February 1993	1 year, 10 months	SDSM
2	Stevo Crvenkovski	Stevo Crvenkovski (1947–2004)	9 February 1993	23 February 1996	3 years	Independent
3	Ljubomir Frčkoski	Ljubomir Frčkoski (born 1957)	23 February 1996	29 May 1997	1 year, 95 days	Independent
4	Blagoj Handziski	Blagoj Handziski (born 1948)	29 May 1997	30 November 1998	1 year, 185 days	Independent
5	Aleksandar Dimitrov	Aleksandar Dimitrov (born 1949)	30 November 1998	30 November 2000	2 years	Democratic Alternative (Republic of Macedonia)
6	Srgjan Kerim	Srgjan Kerim (born 1948)	30 November 2000	13 May 2001	164 days	LPM
7	Ilinka Mitreva	Ilinka Mitreva (1950–2022)	13 May 2001	30 November 2001	201 days	SDSM
8	Slobodan Čašule	Slobodan Čašule (1945–2015)	30 November 2001	1 November 2002	336 days	New Democracy (Republic of Macedonia)
(7)	Ilinka Mitreva	Ilinka Mitreva (1950–2022)	1 November 2002	28 August 2006	3 years, 300 days	SDSM
9	Antonio Milošoski	Antonio Milošoski (born 1976)	28 August 2006	28 July 2011	4 years, 334 days	VMRO-DPMNE
10	Nikola Poposki	Nikola Poposki (born 1977)	28 July 2011	1 June 2017	5 years, 308 days	VMRO-DPMNE
11	Nikola Dimitrov	Nikola Dimitrov (born 1972)	1 June 2017	30 August 2020	3 years, 90 days	Independent
12	Bujar Osmani	Bujar Osmani (born 1979)	30 August 2020	23 June 2024	3 years, 298 days	BDI
13	Timčo Mucunski	Timčo Mucunski (born 1989)	23 June 2024	Incumbent	2 years, 129 days	VMRO-DPMNE

== See also ==
- Politics of North Macedonia
