= Ljubica Acevska =

Macedonian diplomat

- Љубица Ацевска
- Born: 1957 (age 68–69); Capari, Bitola Municipality, SR Macedonia, Yugoslavia
- Citizenship: Macedonia
- Education: Ohio State University
- Title: First Macedonian Ambassador to the United States
- Term: 1995–2002
- Successor: Nikola Dimitrov

Ljubica Z. Acevska (Macedonian: Љубица Ацевска, born 1957) is a Macedonian diplomat. A former U.S. citizen by naturalization and an economic consultant by profession, she quit her job in 1992 to become Macedonia's unofficial liaison in Washington, D.C. and relinquished U.S. citizenship in 1995 to take up her new officially-accredited role as the first Macedonian Ambassador to the United States. She served in that post until 2002, when she was succeeded by Nikola Dimitrov.

== Early life and education ==
Acevska's great-grandfather and her grandfather moved to the United States ahead of her parents, in 1917 and 1940. Her grandfather settled in Mansfield, Ohio, where he opened a restaurant.

Acevska was born and raised in the small village of Capari near Yugoslavia's border with Greece. She emigrated from Yugoslavia to the United States with her parents and brother in 1966; her father and uncle worked at the restaurant owned by her grandfather. She had a bicultural Macedonian American upbringing, learning English in school while speaking Macedonian and eating Macedonian cuisine at home. She went on to attend Ohio State University, where she majored in political science.

== Career ==
Following her schooling, Acevska worked as a graduate school instructor and later became a partner and consultant in Middle East-focused international trade and economic development firm Gulf Enterprises.

=== Lobbying for recognition of Macedonia ===
After Macedonia became an independent country in late 1991 with the breakup of Yugoslavia, Acevska, on her visits to the land of her birth, would often urge government officials there to send a representative to Washington. Eventually, President Kiro Gligorov asked her to take on that job, in what was intended to be only a temporary arrangement lasting for two months. She stepped down from her position at Gulf Enterprises in order to focus on the new appointment. At that point, the United States did not yet formally recognize Macedonia, which had several implications for her role. Rather than being accredited as an ambassador and appearing on the State Department's Diplomatic List, she instead registered under the Foreign Agents Registration Act. With a budget of only $40,000 per year from the Macedonian government, she took on both diplomatic tasks such as debt negotiations with the International Monetary Fund and dealing with complaints from the State Department about Macedonia's adherence to voluntary export restraints or alleged violations of sanctions against Serbia, and consular tasks such as travel advice to Macedonians holding expired Yugoslav passports.

Acevska's temporary, short-term role on behalf of the government of Macedonia ended up turning into one of indefinite length. Her efforts on behalf of Macedonia began producing some results around mid-1993, after the U.S. deployed troops in Macedonia; however, barriers to formal recognition by Washington remained. State Department officials indicated to Acevska that recognition would not be forthcoming until Skopje resolved its issues in its relationship with Athens, in particular the Macedonia naming dispute and the portions of the Constitution of the Republic of Macedonia which might be seen as staking territorial claims on parts of Greece.

=== Ambassadorship ===
In late 1994, there began to be indications that Washington and Skopje would establish formal relations, and it was reported that Victor Comras, the Foreign Service Officer who had set up the U.S. liaison office in Macedonia, would be the first U.S. ambassador to the country. However, the step of being accredited as an ambassador would require Acevska to relinquish her U.S. citizenship, as it is State Department policy not to grant U.S. citizens diplomatic accreditation as ambassadors of foreign countries. She was officially appointed as ambassador in November 1995.

Acevska served as ambassador until 2002, when she was succeeded by Nikola Dimitrov; he was the youngest ambassador in Washington at that point, even younger than Acevska had been when she first took up her unofficial liaison role for Macedonia.

=== Post Ambassador Service ===
Following her service as Ambassador, Acevska became a Public Policy Scholar at the Woodrow Wilson International Center for Scholars, and later became involved with humanitarian work in Haiti. From 2005 to 2008, Acevska co-hosted the Washington DC television talk show Conversations, where she discussed international issues.

== Awards and honors ==
Acevska received the Alumni Medalist Award from her alma mater Ohio State University in 1996 for "international distinction in service to humanity".

In 2000, Acevska was named Ambassador of the Year by the Women's Ambassador Program for her work with Howard University international relations students.

In 2022, United Macedonian Diaspora (UMD) named the "Acevska Congressional Internship Program" (ACIP) in Acevska's honor. She has previously hosted events for the organisation.
