= Donetsk People's Republic–South Ossetia relations =

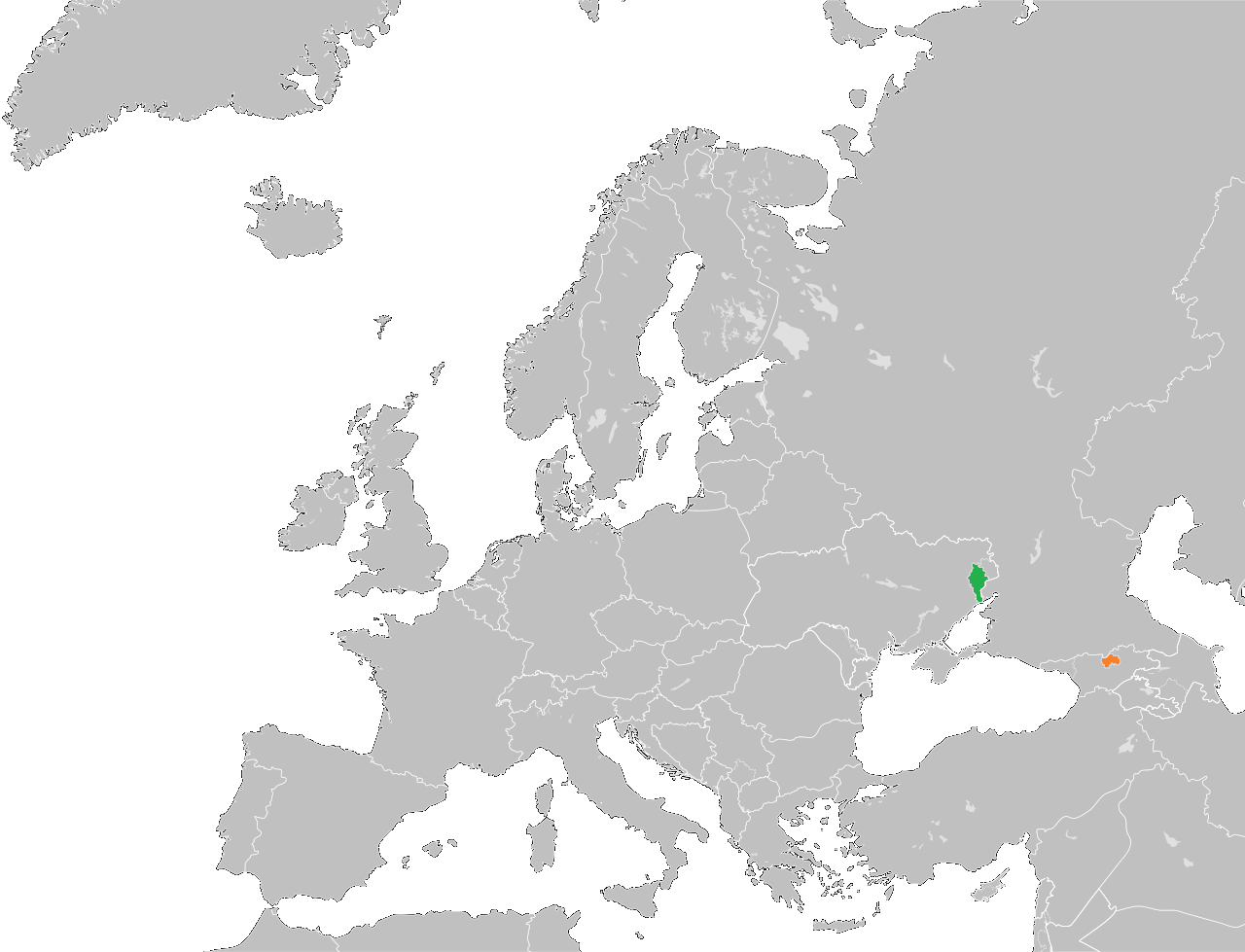

- Donetsk People's Republic: South Ossetia

Diplomatic mission
- Representative Office of South Ossetia, Donetsk

Donetsk People's Republic–South Ossetia relations were the bilateral relations between the Donetsk People's Republic (DPR) and South Ossetia. The DPR is a disputed republic of Russia whereas South Ossetia is a partially recognized state. From April 2014 to September 2022, the DPR portrayed itself as an independent state, but this is no longer the case after Russia's annexation of the DPR on 30 September 2022.

The Russian-annexed DPR is widely internationally unrecognized, with most of the international community regarding the DPR as a Russian military occupation of a portion of Ukraine's Donetsk Oblast (roughly 60% as of October 2022). Meanwhile, South Ossetia is also widely internationally unrecognized, with most of the international community regarding South Ossetia as a part of Georgia.

The DPR and South Ossetia maintained bilateral relations from June 2014 to September 2022. The relations have become defunct in the international relations sense (state-to-state) after Russia's annexation of the DPR. South Ossetia still maintains relations with the DPR in the subnational sense (state-to-province).

== History ==
In April 2014, pro-Russian separatists in the Donbas occupied the city of Donetsk and declared independence from Ukraine, having taken control of a portion of Donetsk Oblast, with the rest of the oblast remaining under Ukrainian rule. In the meantime, South Ossetian Ambassador to Russia Dmitry Medoyev received a delegation from DPR Chairman Denis Pushilin at the latter's request. During the meeting, Pushilin asked Medoyev to address an appeal to South Ossetian president Leonid Tibilov and parliamentary Chairman Stanislav Kochiev to recognize the DPR's independence.

On June 27, South Ossetia's Security Council decided to recognize the Donetsk People's Republic. South Ossetia's president told the media: "I believe the recognition of the Donetsk republic is the right step, South Ossetia's people support and hail the decision to recognize Donetsk and Luhansk."

On May 13, 2015, the Donetsk People's Republic Foreign Ministry said in a statement that President Alexander Zakharchenko signed the decree recognizing Abkhazia and South Ossetia.

Celebrations were held in Tskhinvali when Russia recognized Donetsk and Luhansk, organized by the South Ossetian government.

== See also ==
- List of diplomatic missions of the Donetsk People's Republic
- Foreign relations of South Ossetia
