= Slobodan Čašule =

Macedonian politician (1945–2015)

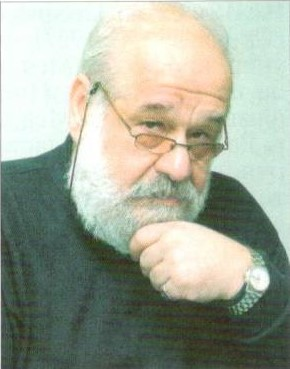

Minister of Foreign Affairs of the Republic of Macedonia

Personal details
- Born: September 27, 1945 Skopje, Yugoslavia
- Died: December 18, 2015 (aged 70) Madrid, Spain

Slobodan Čašule (September 27, 1945 – December 18, 2015) was Foreign Minister of the Republic of Macedonia in 2001–2002; he was appointed November 30, 2001. He became well known for his strong policy of the protection of the state name in the United Nations sponsored negotiations with Greece in the Macedonia naming dispute. Čašule was the ambassador of Macedonia to Spain.

He was the son of the Macedonian writer Kole Čašule.

Political offices
Preceded by Ilinka Mitreva	Minister of Foreign Affairs; 2001-2002	Succeeded by Ilinka Mitreva
