= Stevo Crvenkovski =

Macedonian politician (1947–2004)

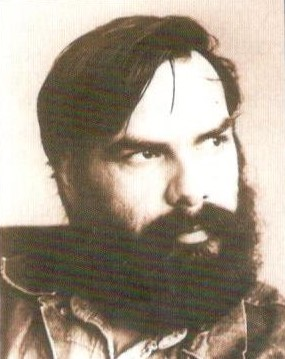
Stevo Crvenkovski

Stevo Crvenkovski (Macedonian: Стево Црвенковски; March 18, 1947 in Skopje – February 4, 2004 in Skopje) was a Macedonian film and television director, and after the independence of the Republic of North Macedonia also a politician and diplomat. A member of the Social Democratic Union of Macedonia, he served as deputy prime minister under Branko Crvenkovski from 1992 to 1994 and as foreign minister of the Republic from 1993 to 1996. He later served as an ambassador to the United Kingdom.

Political offices
Preceded by Denko Maleski	Minister of Foreign Affairs; 1993-1996	Succeeded by Ljubomir Frckoski
