= Donetsk People's Republic–Russia relations =

- Donetsk People's Republic: Russia

The Russian Federation and the Donetsk People's Republic sign a document establishing diplomatic relations

Donetsk People's Republic–Russia relations were bilateral relations between Russia and the Donetsk People's Republic (DPR). The DPR is widely internationally unrecognized, with most of the international community regarding the DPR as a Russian military occupation of a portion of Ukraine's Donetsk Oblast (roughly 60% as of October 2022). The DPR was annexed by Russia on 30 September 2022; the DPR authorities willingly acceded to Russia, and the annexation is widely internationally unrecognized. From April 2014 to September 2022, the DPR portrayed itself as an independent state, and it was widely regarded as a puppet state of Russia by the international community.

== Background ==
The Donetsk People's Republic was proclaimed in April 2014, declaring independence from Ukraine. It was proclaimed in the territory of Ukraine's Donetsk Oblast, in the Donbas region. The DPR separated from Ukraine through military force, with assistance from Russia.

A referendum was held by the newly declared DPR authorities, asking citizens of Donetsk Oblast to agree or disagree to the creation of the new republic. The referendum was deemed illegal by the Ukrainian government and by most governments in Europe, except for Russia.

The Luhansk People's Republic was created in a similar manner in the neighbouring Luhansk Oblast in Ukraine in April 2014. Meanwhile, in February–March 2014, Russia annexed Crimea in southern Ukraine, following a declaration of independence by the "Republic of Crimea".

== DPR–Russia relations ==
=== Unofficial relations (2014–2022) ===
Documents issued by the Donetsk and Luhansk People's Republics have been valid in Russia since 2017. This allowed residents to work, travel, or study in Russia. Russia has issued 400,000 Russian passports to residents of the republics since 2019. Ukraine also claims that Russia pays pensions for residents of the republics (Ukraine stopped paying after 2014).

=== Official relations (2022) ===
Presidential Decree No. 71, dated 21 February 2022, recognizing the independence of the Donetsk People's Republic

On February 16, 2022, the Russian Duma passed a resolution calling for the republics of Donetsk and Luhansk to be recognized as soon as possible.

On February 20, Putin convened a meeting of the Security Council on live television, and asked ministers to express their views on whether to recognize the two republics in the Donbas. The officials present almost agreed. On February 21, the President of the Donetsk Republic Denis Pushilin and the Lugansk Republic signed a document in the Kremlin. The Russian Federation recognizes the Donetsk People's Republic, and the two sides continue to discuss a military defense agreement. After the recognition, Putin publicly stated that since he has recognized Donbas, there is no need to continue to abide by the Minsk agreement.

After annexation of Southern and Eastern Ukraine, Donetsk People's Republic was officially merged into Russia, however this status is recognized just by Russia itself together with a few of its allies. This status does not have support across most of the international community.

== See also ==
- Luhansk People's Republic–Russia relations
- Foreign relations of Russia
