= Bujar Osmani =

Macedonian politician

- Бујар Османи
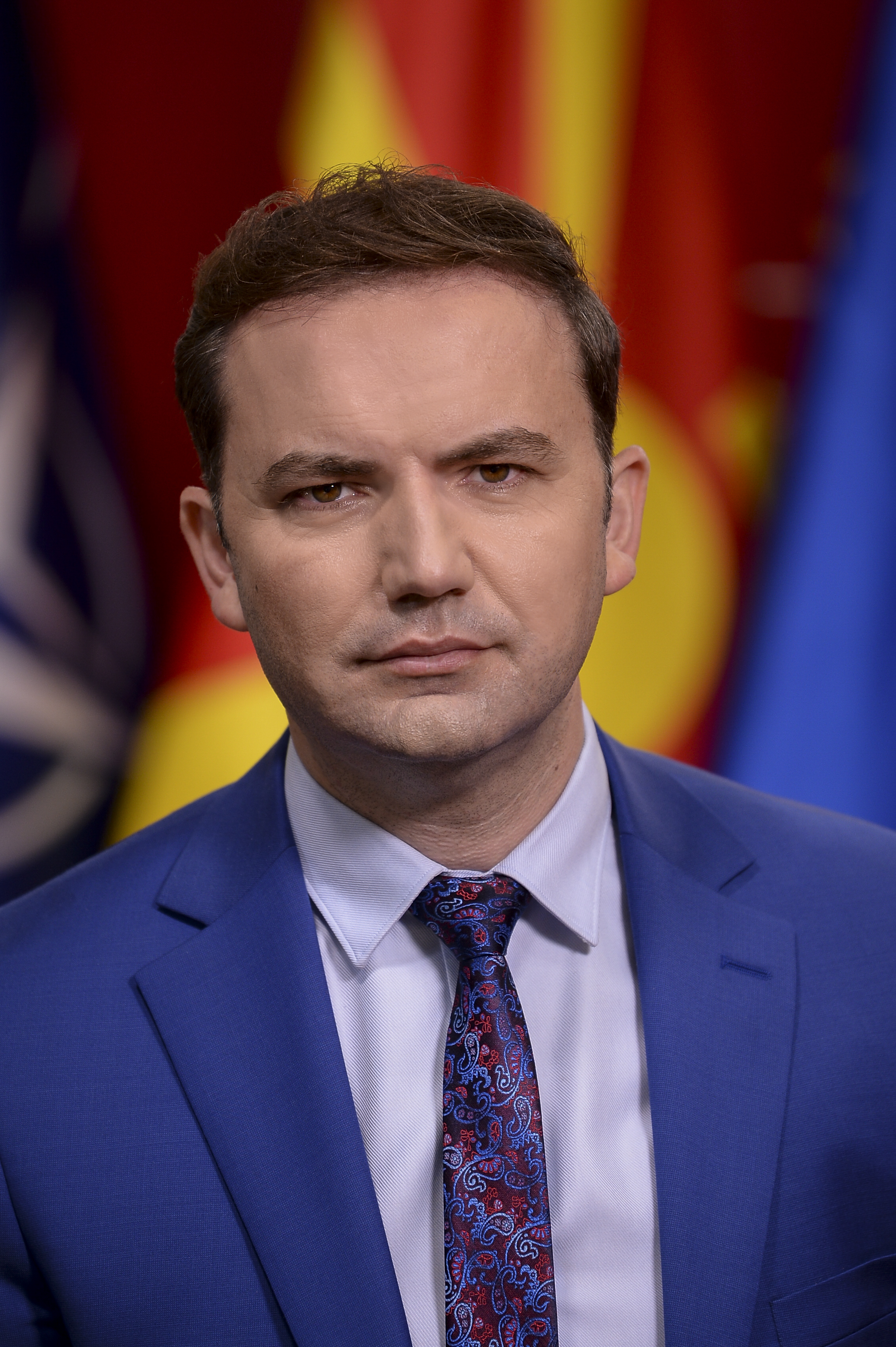
- Official portrait, 2020

Minister of Foreign Affairs
- In office 30 August 2020 – 23 June 2024
- Prime Minister: Zoran Zaev; Dimitar Kovačevski; Talat Xhaferi
- Preceded by: Nikola Dimitrov
- Succeeded by: Timčo Mucunski

Chairman-in-Office of the Organization for Security and Co-operation in Europe
- In office 1 January 2023 – 1 January 2024
- Preceded by: Zbigniew Rau
- Succeeded by: Ian Borg

Minister of Health
- In office 27 July 2008 – 28 July 2011
- Prime Minister: Nikola Gruevski
- Preceded by: Imer Selmani
- Succeeded by: Nikola Todorov

Deputy Prime Minister for European Integration (North Macedonia)
- In office 31 May 2017 – 30 August 2020
- Prime Minister: Zoran Zaev; Oliver Spasovski
- Succeeded by: Nikola Dimitrov

Personal details
- Born: 11 September 1979 (age 47) Skopje, SR Macedonia, SFR Yugoslavia
- Party: DUI
- Spouse: Valbona Hoxha (m. 2012)

Bujar Osmani (Macedonian: Бујар Османи, born 11 September 1979) is a Macedonian politician of Albanian descent who served as the Minister of Foreign Affairs of North Macedonia from 2020 until 2024 and Minister of Health from 2008 until 2011. In June 2017, he was appointed Deputy Prime Minister in charge of European affairs. On 30 August 2020, Osmani became Minister of Foreign Affairs. Osmani was the first Macedonian of Albanian descent to lead the top diplomatic post in North Macedonia.

He was previously a doctor at the Public Hospital in Skopje.

On 26 November 2019, an earthquake struck Albania. Osmani was part of a delegation of Albanian politicians from North Macedonia visiting the earthquake epicentre that expressed their condolences to Albanian president Ilir Meta.

With North Macedonia assuming the Chairmanship of the Organization for Security and Co-operation in Europe for 2023, Osmani became the Chairman-in-Office of the OSCE on 1 January 2023.

Political offices
Preceded by Imer Selmani	Minister of Health; 2008–2011	Succeeded by Nikola Todorov
Preceded by Nikola Dimitrov	Minister of Foreign Affairs; 2020–2024	Succeeded by Timčo Mucunski
