= Leskoec, Resen =

Leskoec Лескоец
- Village
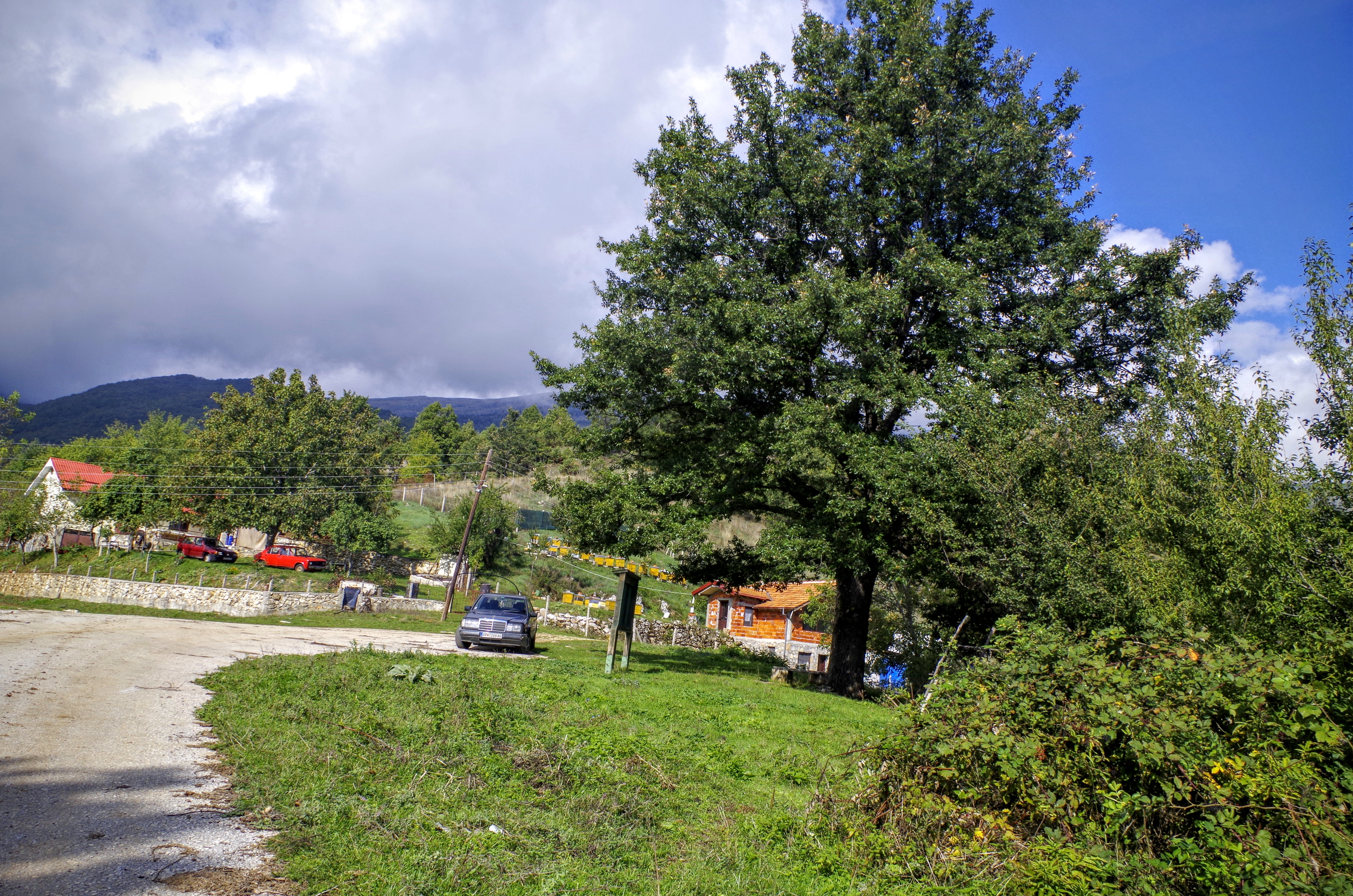
- View of the village Leskoec

- Location within North Macedonia
- Coordinates: 40°57′25.599″N 20°52′32.93″E
- Country: North Macedonia
- Region: Pelagonia
- Municipality: Resen

Population (2002)
  - Total: 12
- Time zone: UTC+1 (CET)
  - Summer (DST): UTC+2 (CEST)
- Postal code: 7310
- Area code: +389
- Car plates: RE

Leskoec (Macedonian: Лескоец) is a village in the Resen Municipality of North Macedonia, west of Lake Prespa. Situated near the Albanian border, it is located under 19 kilometres (12 mi) from Resen.

== Demographics ==
Leskoec has a dozen inhabitants, as of the most recent national census in 2002, a fraction of its 1961 population.

Ethnic group	census 1961		census 1971		census 1981		census 1991		census 1994		census 2002	
Ethnic group	Number	%	Number	%	Number	%	Number	%	Number	%	Number	%
Macedonians	239	100.0	160	100.0	87	100.0	17	100.0	13	100.0	12	100.0
Total	239		160		87		17		13		12	
