= Leva Reka =

Leva Reka may refer to:

- Leva Reka, Vranje, a village in Serbia
- Leva Reka, Resen, a village in North Macedonia
