= Gorno Krušje =

Gorno Krušje Горно Крушје
- Village
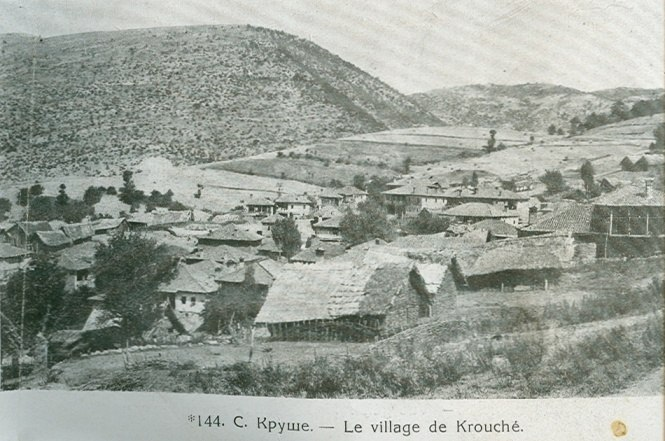
- Krušje around 1910

- Location within North Macedonia
- Coordinates: 41°09′30″N 20°58′54″E
- Country: North Macedonia
- Region: Pelagonia
- Municipality: Resen

Population (2002)
  - Total: 107
- Time zone: UTC+1 (CET)
  - Summer (DST): UTC+2 (CEST)
- Area code: +389
- Car plates: RE

Gorno Krušje (Macedonian: Горно Крушје), or simply Krušje, is a village in northern Resen Municipality, North Macedonia, located roughly 7.7 kilometres (4.8 mi) from the municipal centre of Resen. The village has 107 residents as of the most recent census in 2002.

== Demographics ==
Gorno Krušje has been exclusively inhabited by ethnic Macedonians.

Ethnic group	census 1961		census 1971		census 1981		census 1991		census 1994		census 2002	
Ethnic group	Number	%	Number	%	Number	%	Number	%	Number	%	Number	%
Macedonians	414	100	281	100	215	100	137	100	123	100	107	100
Total	414		281		215		137		123		107	
