= Gorno Dupeni =

Gorno Dupeni Горно Дупени
- Village
- Location within North Macedonia
- Coordinates: 41°03′43″N 20°58′31″E
- Country: North Macedonia
- Region: Pelagonia
- Municipality: Resen

Population (2002)
  - Total: 59
- Time zone: UTC+1 (CET)
  - Summer (DST): UTC+2 (CEST)
- Area code: +389
- Car plates: RE

Gorno Dupeni (Macedonian: Горно Дупени) is a village in the Resen Municipality of North Macedonia, north of Lake Prespa. It is located roughly 4.5 kilometres (2.8 mi) from the municipal centre of Resen.

== Demographics ==
Gorno Dupeni has 59 inhabitants as of the most recent census of 2002. Macedonians have historically made up almost all of the village population.

Ethnic group	census 1961		census 1971		census 1981		census 1991		census 1994		census 2002	
Ethnic group	Number	%	Number	%	Number	%	Number	%	Number	%	Number	%
Macedonians	349	100	303	99.7	231	99.6	148	96.7	104	100	59	100
others	0	0.0	1	0.3	1	0.4	5	3.3	0	0.0	0	0.0
Total	349		304		232		153		104		59	
