= Bolno =

Bolno Болно
- Village
- Location within North Macedonia
- Coordinates: 41°06′33″N 20°58′19″E
- Country: North Macedonia
- Region: Pelagonia
- Municipality: Resen

Population (2002)
  - Total: 237
- Time zone: UTC+1 (CET)
  - Summer (DST): UTC+2 (CEST)
- Area code: +389
- Car plates: RE

Bolno (Macedonian: Болно) is a village in the Resen Municipality of North Macedonia, near the mountain of Galičica. Located under 4 kilometres (2.5 mi) east of the municipal centre of Resen, the village has 237 residents. It is also home to a football club, FK Ilinden.

== History ==
Bolno is located near the Iron Age site of Selishte, which excavations of the 2010s characterized as an Illyrian fort in the Prespa-Ohrid lakeland region.

In the early 20th century, the village had population of 640 Bulgarian Exarchists. There was also Bulgarian school in Bolno (Bouno).

During the Ilinden–Preobrazhenie Uprising of 1903, Bolno was looted and its 96 houses were burnt down.

== Demographics ==
Bolno has historically been inhabited by Orthodox Bulgarians. According to the censuses after 1948 the local population is consisted of ethnic Macedonians.

Ethnic group	census 1961		census 1971		census 1981		census 1991		census 1994		census 2002	
Ethnic group	Number	%	Number	%	Number	%	Number	%	Number	%	Number	%
Macedonians	596	99.3	475	99.0	510	98.7	432	99.5	287	99.3	234	98.7
others	4	0.7	5	1.0	7	1.4	2	0.5	2	0.7	3	1.3
Total	600		480		517		434		289		237	

== People from Bolno ==
- Dimitar Bogoevski (1918 - 1942), communist revolutionary and poet
- Evtim Bogoev (? - 1908), revolutionary, IMARO activist.
