= Stipona =

Stipona Стипона
- Village
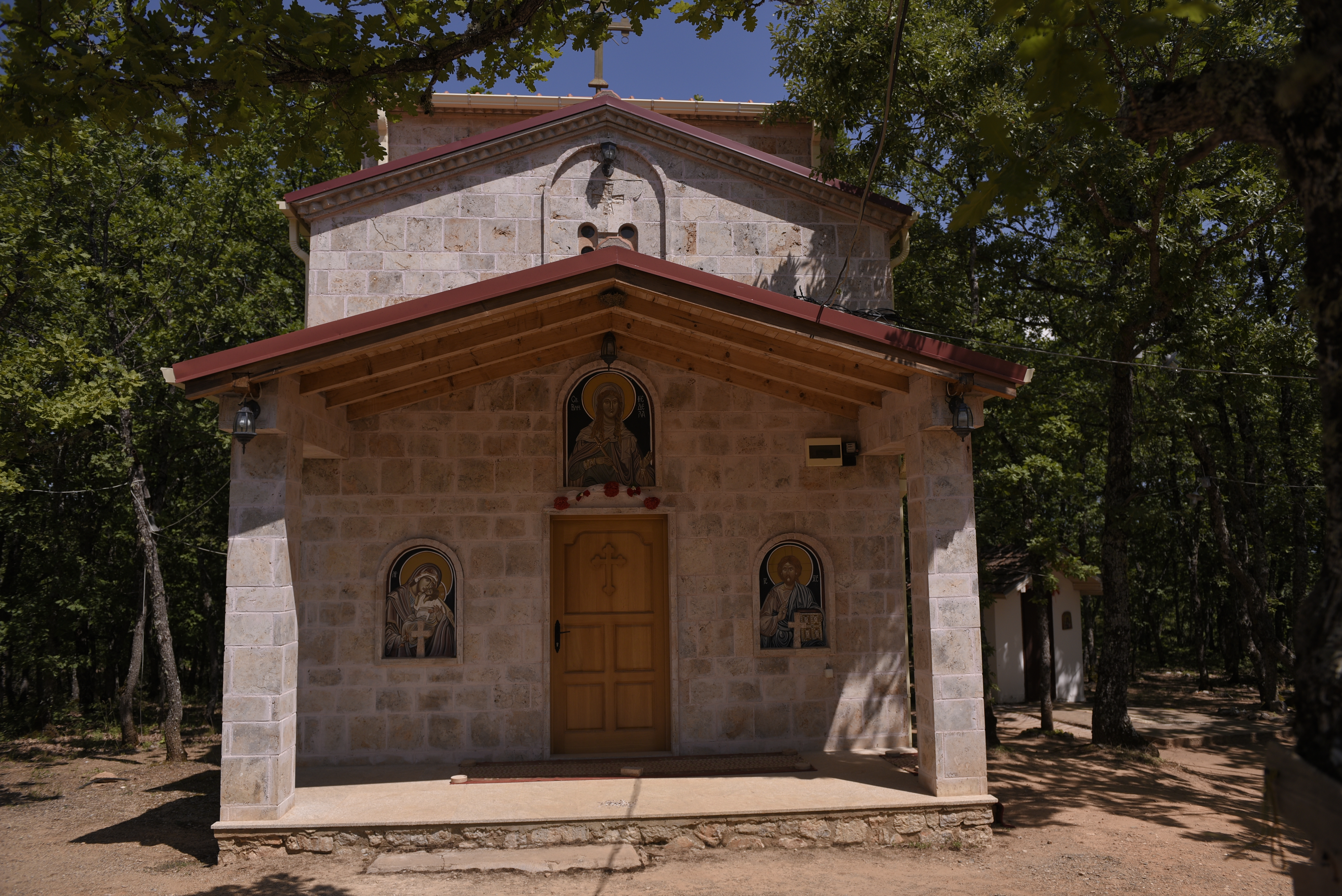
- The Church of Saint Nedela

- Location within North Macedonia
- Coordinates: 41°03′36″N 20°57′19″E
- Country: North Macedonia
- Region: Pelagonia
- Municipality: Resen

Population (2002)
  - Total: 0
- Time zone: UTC+1 (CET)
  - Summer (DST): UTC+2 (CEST)
- Area code: +389
- Car plates: RE

Stipona (Macedonian: Стипона) is a village in the northwestern part of the Resen Municipality of the Republic of North Macedonia, near the mountain of Galičica. The village is under 6 kilometres (3.7 mi) from the municipal centre of Resen. The village is deserted.

== Demographics ==
The last census in which Stipona still had permanent residents was in 1981.

Ethnic group	census 1961		census 1971		census 1981		census 1991		census 1994		census 2002		census 2021	
Ethnic group	Number	%	Number	%	Number	%	Number	%	Number	%	Number	%	Number	%
Macedonians	44	100	45	97.8	17	100	0	-	0	-	0	-	0	-
others	0	0	1	2.2	0	-	0	-	0	-	0	-	0	-
Total	44		46		17		0		0		0		0	
