= Gorna Bela Crkva =

Gorna Bela Crkva Горна Бела Црква Bollocërkë e Sipërme Yukarı Bela Tsırkva
- Village
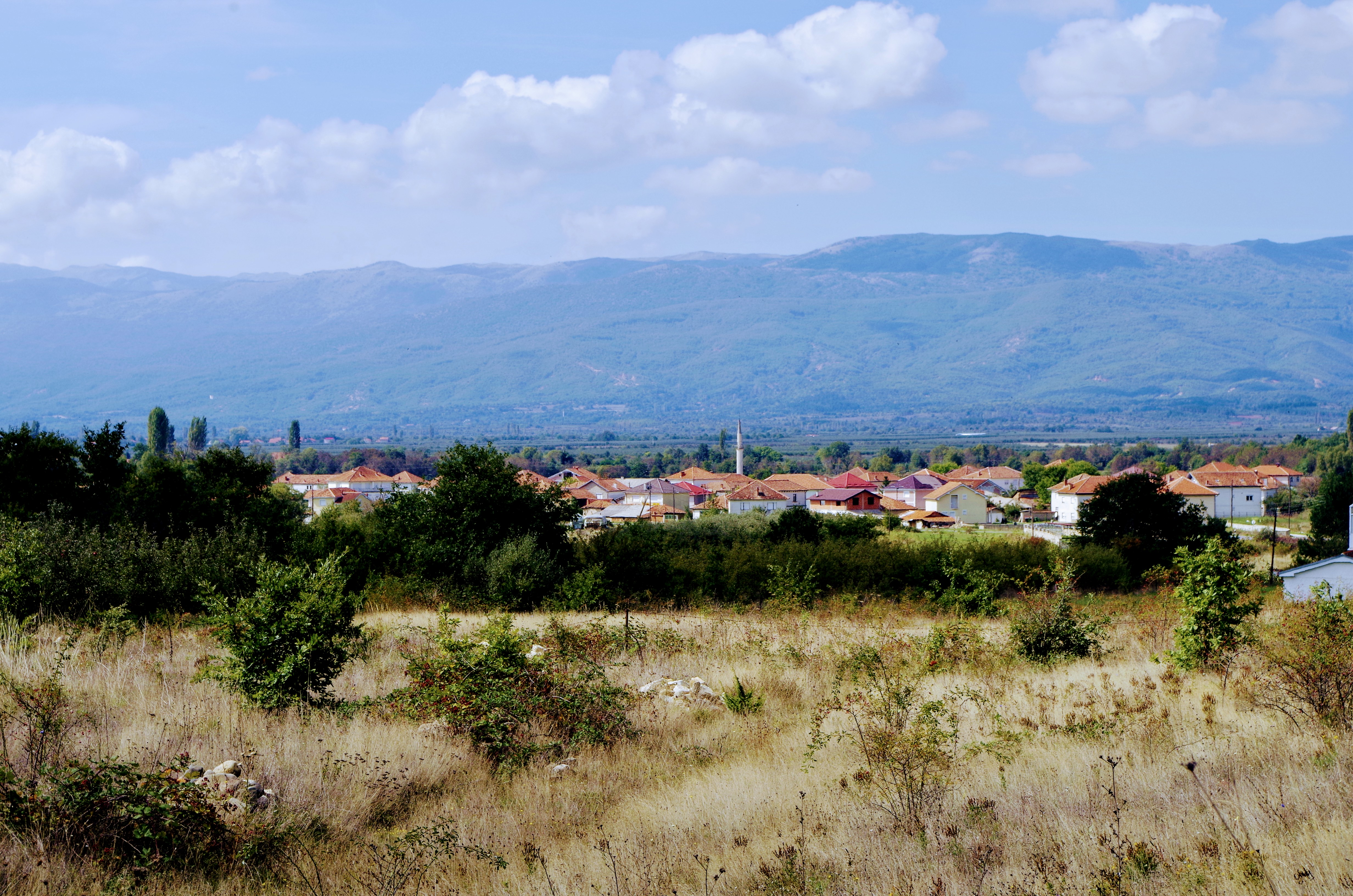
- Panoramic view of the village

- Location within North Macedonia
- Coordinates: 41°03′00″N 21°01′40″E
- Country: North Macedonia
- Region: Pelagonia
- Municipality: Resen

Population (2021)
  - Total: 213
- Time zone: UTC+1 (CET)
  - Summer (DST): UTC+2 (CEST)
- Area code: +389
- Car plates: RE

Gorna Bela Crkva (Macedonian: Горна Бела Црква, meaning Upper White Church; Albanian: Bollocërkë e Sipërme; Turkish: Yukarı Bela Tsırkva) is a village in the Resen Municipality of the Republic of North Macedonia, north of Lake Prespa. The village is situated under 7 kilometres (4.3 mi) from the municipal centre of Resen.

== Demographics ==
Gorna Bela Crkva has a mixed population of Bektashi Muslim Albanians, known locally as Kolonjarë, Turks, and Macedonians.

Ethnic group	census 1961		census 1971		census 1981		census 1991		census 1994		census 2002		census 2021	
Ethnic group	Number	%	Number	%	Number	%	Number	%	Number	%	Number	%	Number	%
Macedonians	2	0.5	3	0.6	1	0.2	1	0.2	0	0.0	0	0.0	9	4.2
Albanians	141	32.5	207	40.9	332	56.2	135	28.3	117	54.4	114	61.0	109	51.2
Turks	290	66.8	291	57.5	220	37.2	106	22.2	98	45.6	73	39.0	88	41.3
others	1	0.2	5	1.0	38	6.4	235	49.3	0	0.0	0	0.0	0	0.0
Persons for whom data are taken from administrative sources													7	3.3
Total	434		506		591		477		215		187		213	
