= Pokrvenik =

Pokrvenik Покрвеник
- Village
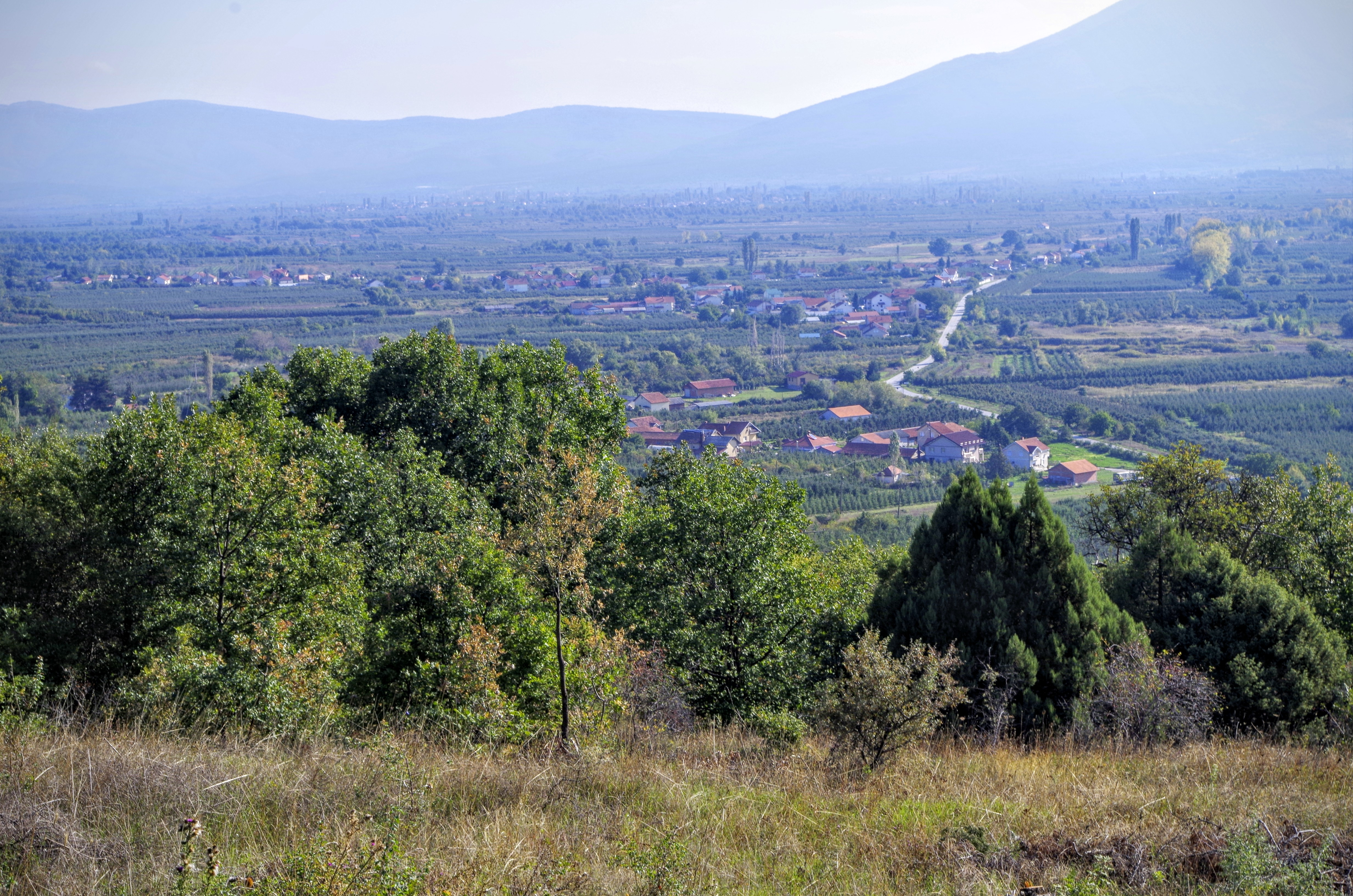
- Panoramic view of the village Pokrvenik (the last one), in foreground are villages Šurlenci and Volkoderi

- Location within North Macedonia
- Coordinates: 41°01′00″N 20°57′23″E
- Country: North Macedonia
- Region: Pelagonia
- Municipality: Resen

Population (2021)
  - Total: 70
- Time zone: UTC+1 (CET)
  - Summer (DST): UTC+2 (CEST)
- Area code: +389
- Car plates: RE

Pokrvenik (Macedonian: Покрвеник) is a village northwest of Lake Prespa in the Resen Municipality of the Republic of North Macedonia. The village is located over 9 kilometres (5.6 mi) from the municipal centre of Resen.

== Demographics ==
With the exception of 1981, Pokrvenik's population has declined in every census since 1961 and 2021.

Ethnic group	census 1961		census 1971		census 1981		census 1991		census 1994		census 2002		census 2021	
Ethnic group	Number	%	Number	%	Number	%	Number	%	Number	%	Number	%	Number	%
Macedonians	157	98.7	130	98.5	139	98.6	101	100	100	100	65	100	69	98.6
others	2	1.3	2	1.5	2	1.4	0	0.0	0	0.0	0	0.0	0	0.0
Persons for whom data are taken from administrative sources													1	1.4
Total	159		132		141		101		100		65		70	
