= Dolna Bela Crkva =

Dolna Bela Crkva Долна Бела Црква Bollocërkë e Poshtme
- Village
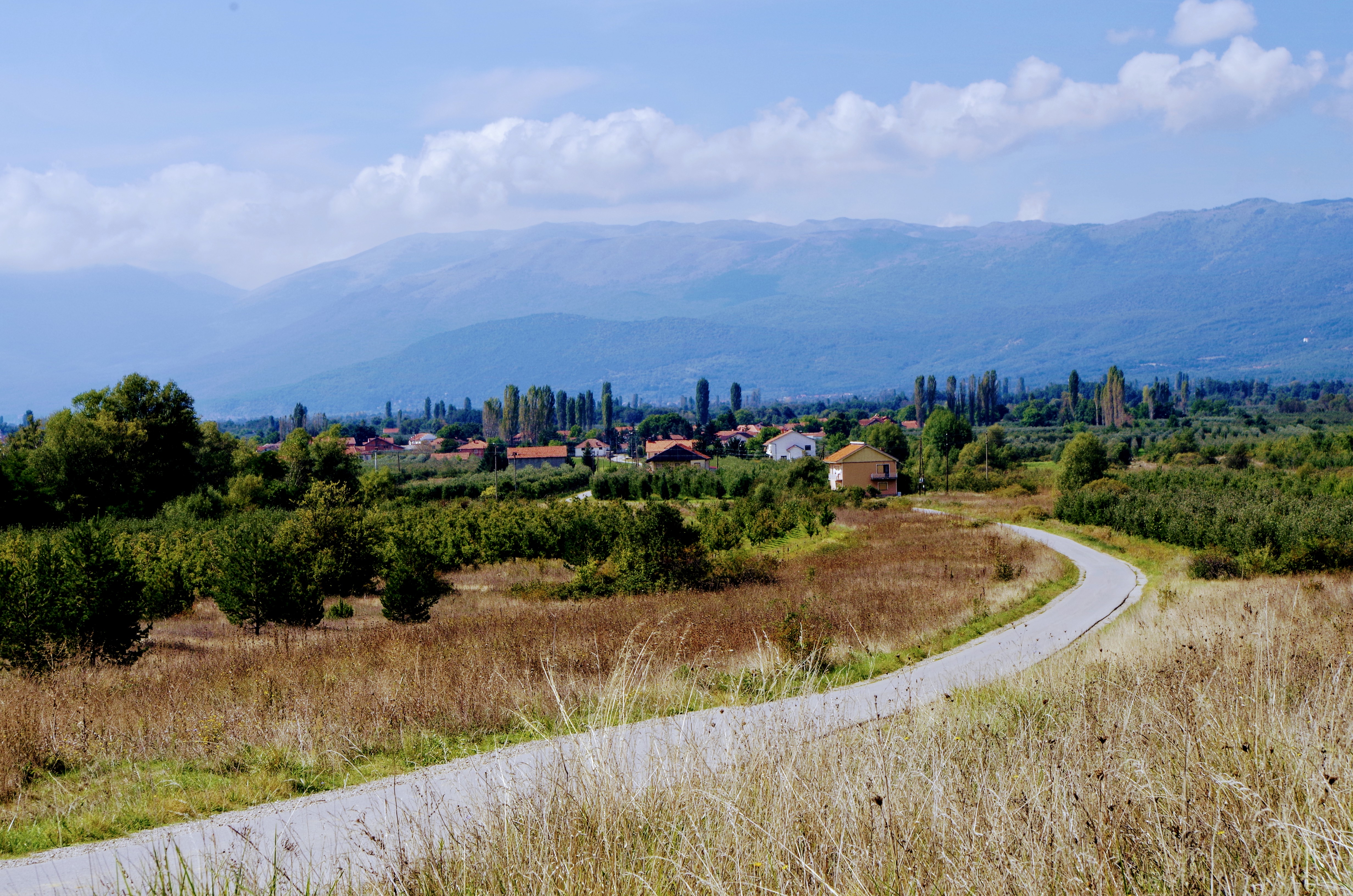
- Panoramic view of the village Dolna Bela Crkva

- Location within North Macedonia
- Coordinates: 41°02′12″N 21°01′52″E
- Country: North Macedonia
- Region: Pelagonia
- Municipality: Resen

Population (2002)
  - Total: 237
- Time zone: UTC+1 (CET)
  - Summer (DST): UTC+2 (CEST)
- Area code: +389
- Car plates: RE

Dolna Bela Crkva (Macedonian: Долна Бела Црвка, meaning Lower White Church; Albanian: Bollocërkë e Poshtme) is a village in the Resen Municipality of North Macedonia, north of Lake Prespa. The village, located roughly 6 kilometres (3.7 mi) from the municipal centre of Resen, has 237 residents.

== Demographics ==
Dolna Bela Crkva has an Orthodox ethnic Macedonian majority, with a significant Muslim Albanian Sunni and Bektashi minority, of whom the latter are known locally as Kolonjarë. Sunni Albanians in Dolna Bela Crkva traditionally highlighted their religious identity over a linguistic one having closer economic and social relations with Turks and Macedonian Muslims in the region and being distant from Orthodox Macedonians. Over time these differences have disappeared through intermarriage, closer communal and cultural relations with Bektashi and other Sunni Prespa Albanian communities in the region.

As of the 2021 census, Dolna Bela Crkva had 179 residents.

Ethnic group	census 1961		census 1971		census 1981		census 1991		census 1994		census 2002		census 2021	
Ethnic group	Number	%	Number	%	Number	%	Number	%	Number	%	Number	%	Number	%
Macedonians	222	65.1	230	56.9	259	64.8	215	70.7	167	67.1	156	65.8	117	65.4
Albanians	119	34.9	173	42.8	138	34.5	82	27.0	82	32.9	81	34.2	56	31.3
others	0	0.0	1	0.3	3	0.8	7	2.3	0	0.0	0	0.0	0	0.0
Persons for whom data are taken from administrative sources													6	3.4
Total	341		404		400		304		249		237		179	

== Gallery ==
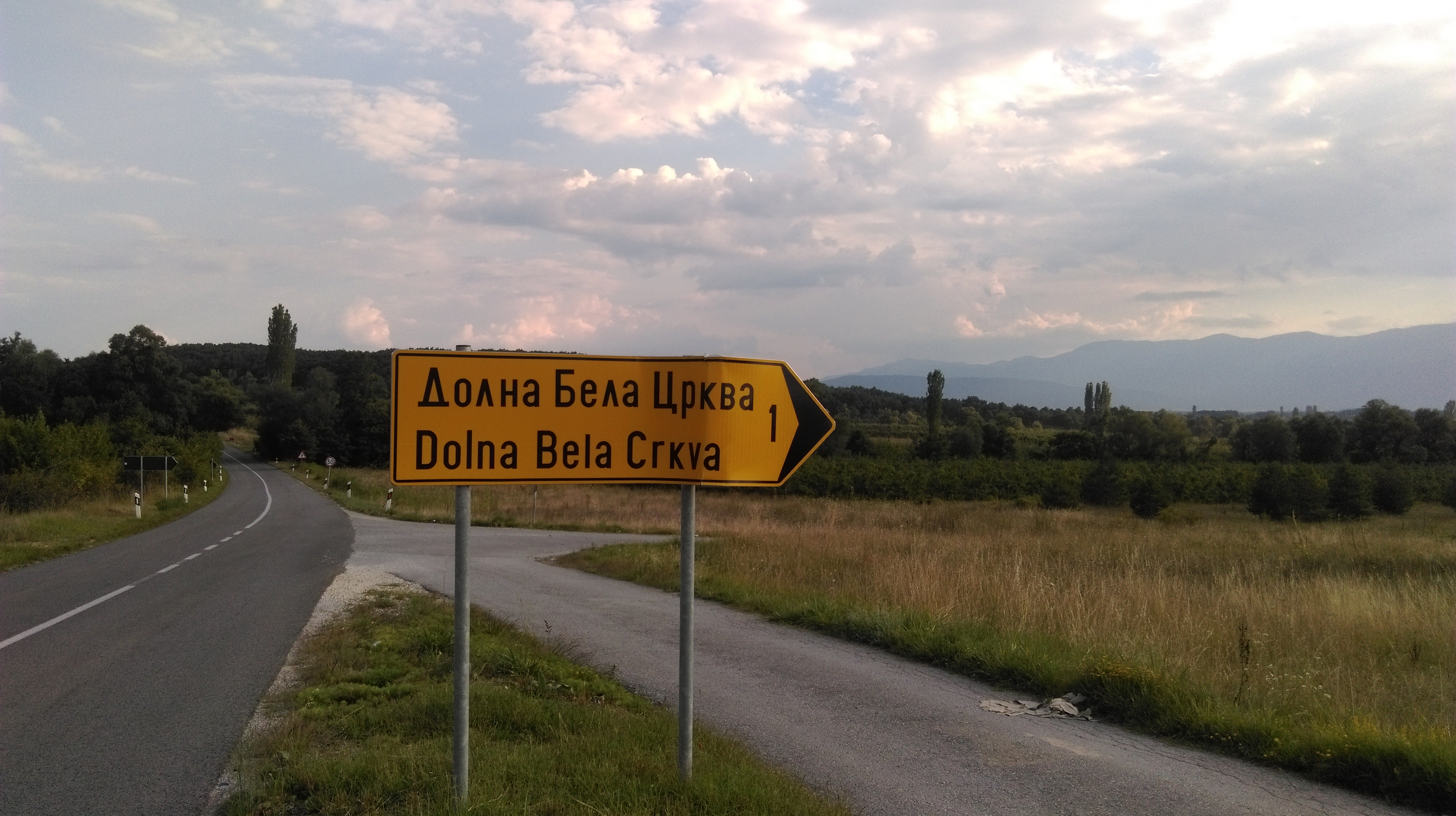
Sign on main road hailing entrance into Dolna Bela Crkva

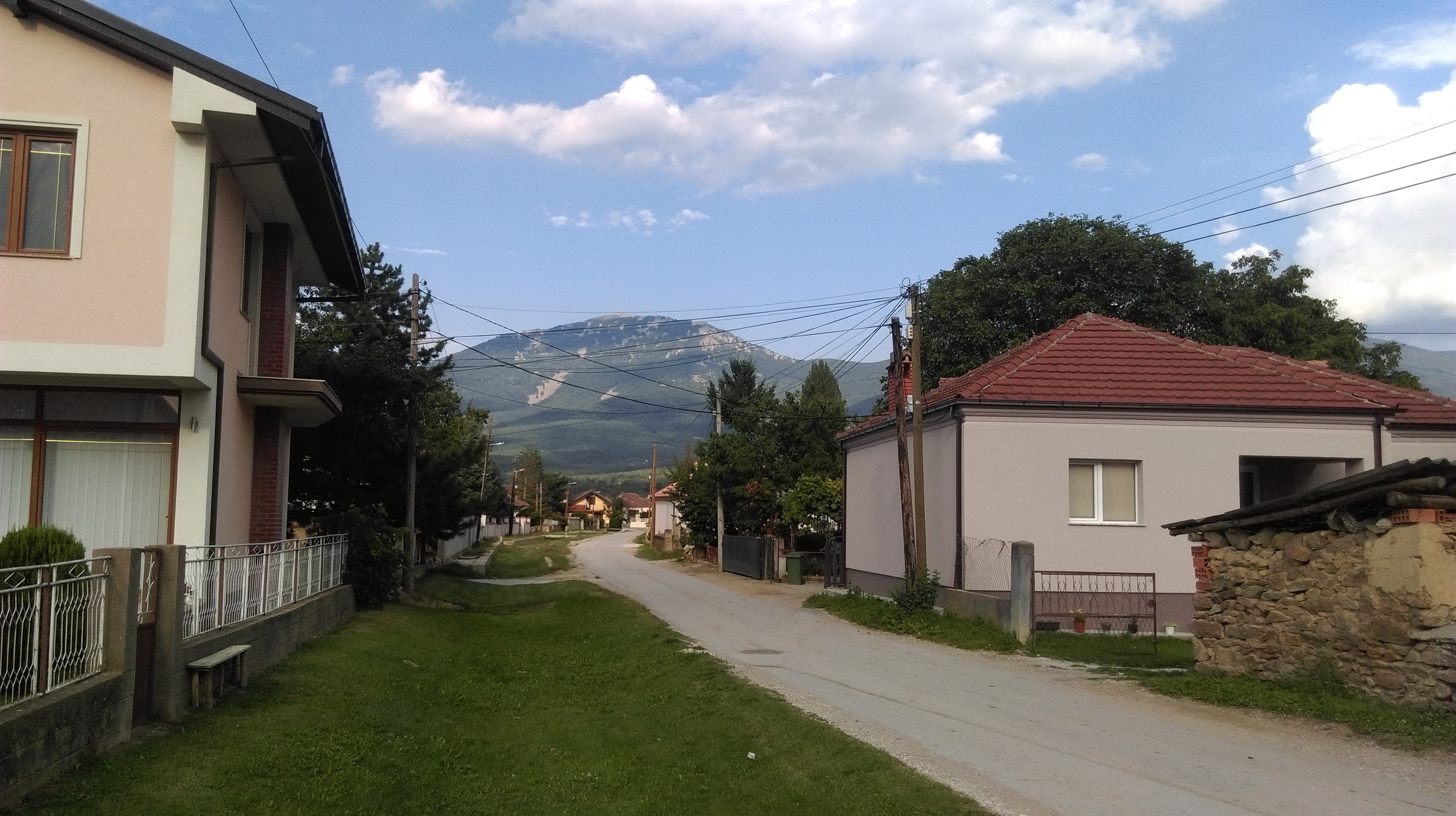
Architecture of Dolna Bela Crkva

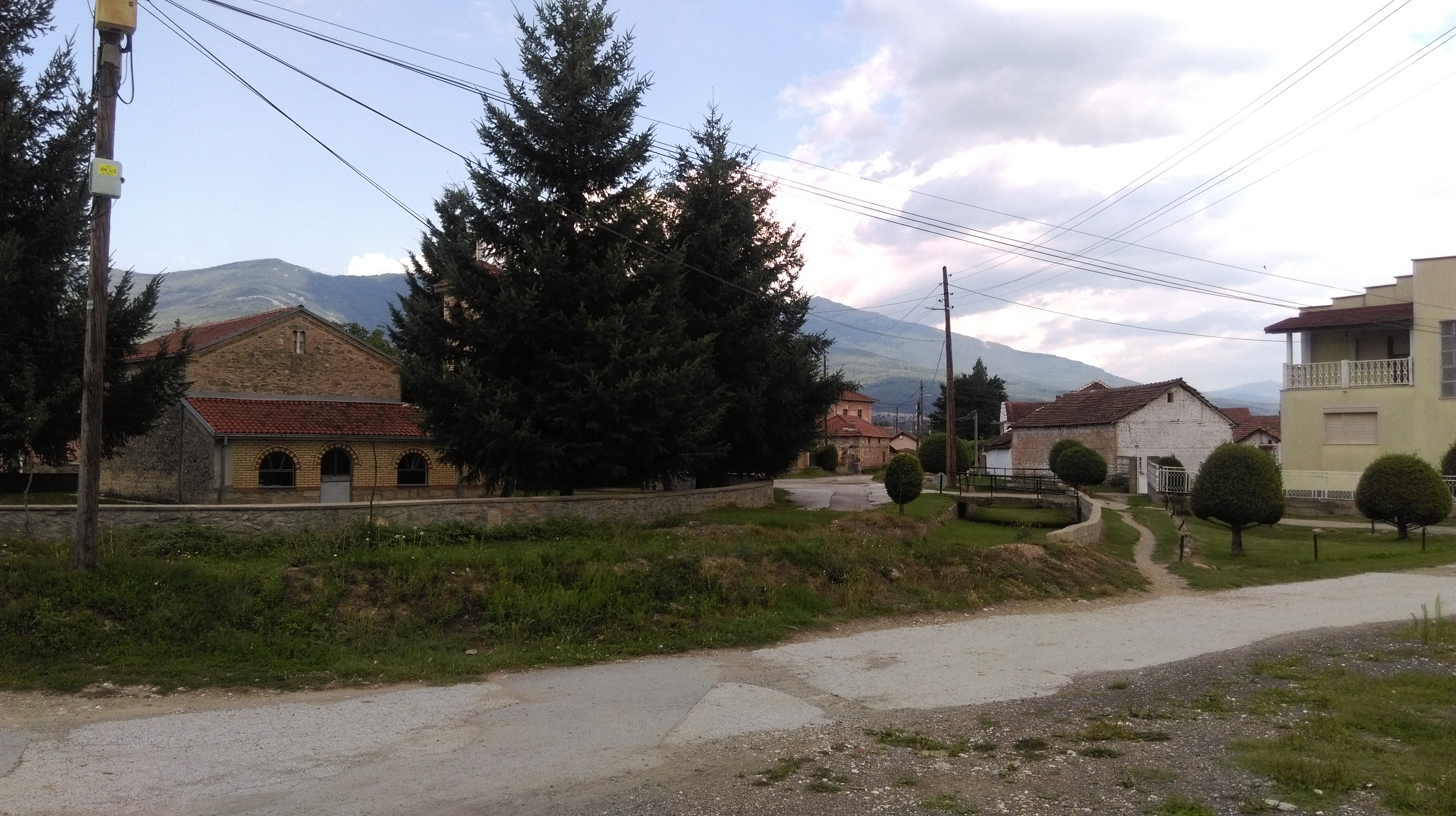
Dolna Bela Crkva village centre

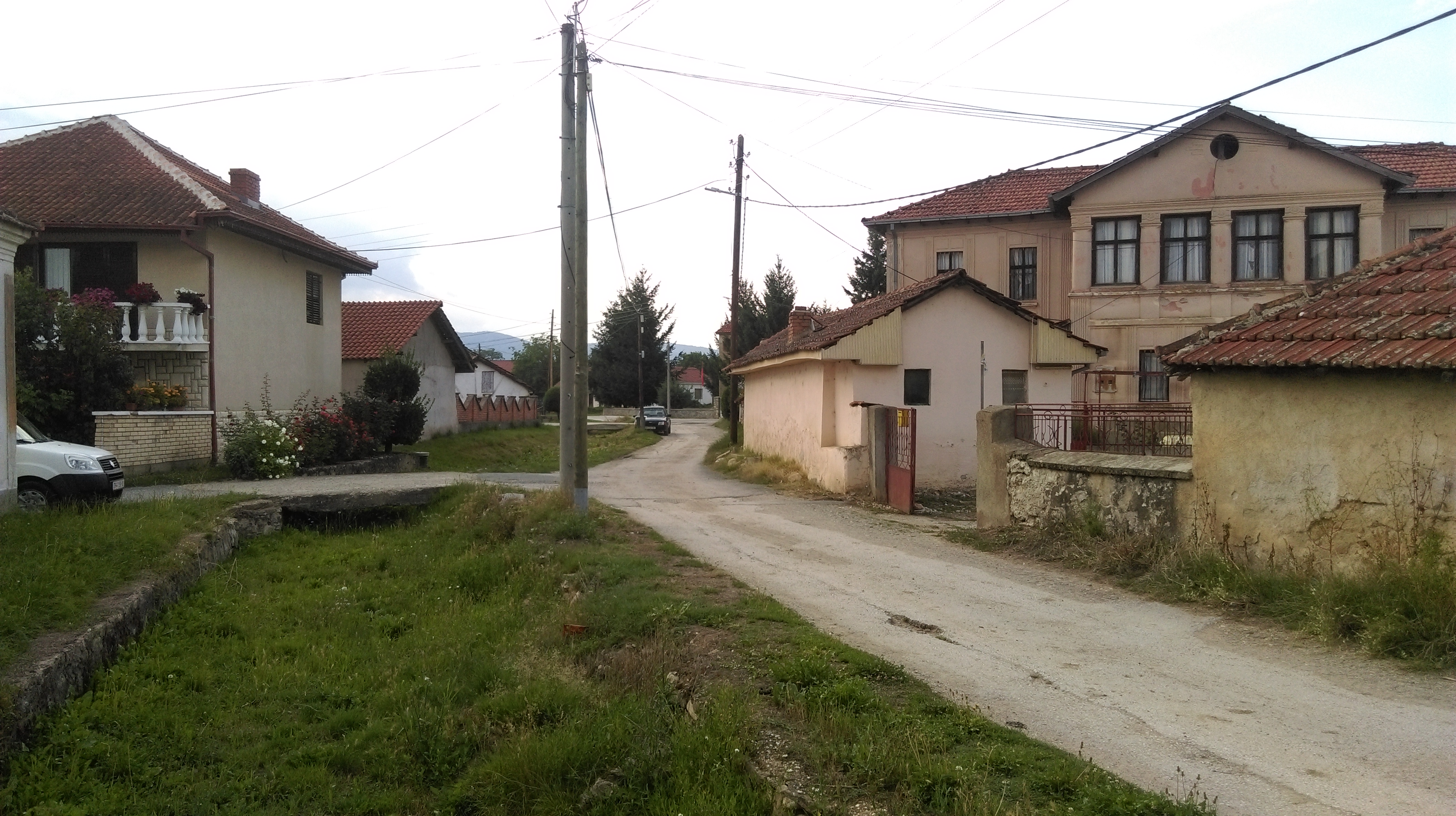
Contemporary (left) and traditional (right) architecture of Dolna Bela Crkva

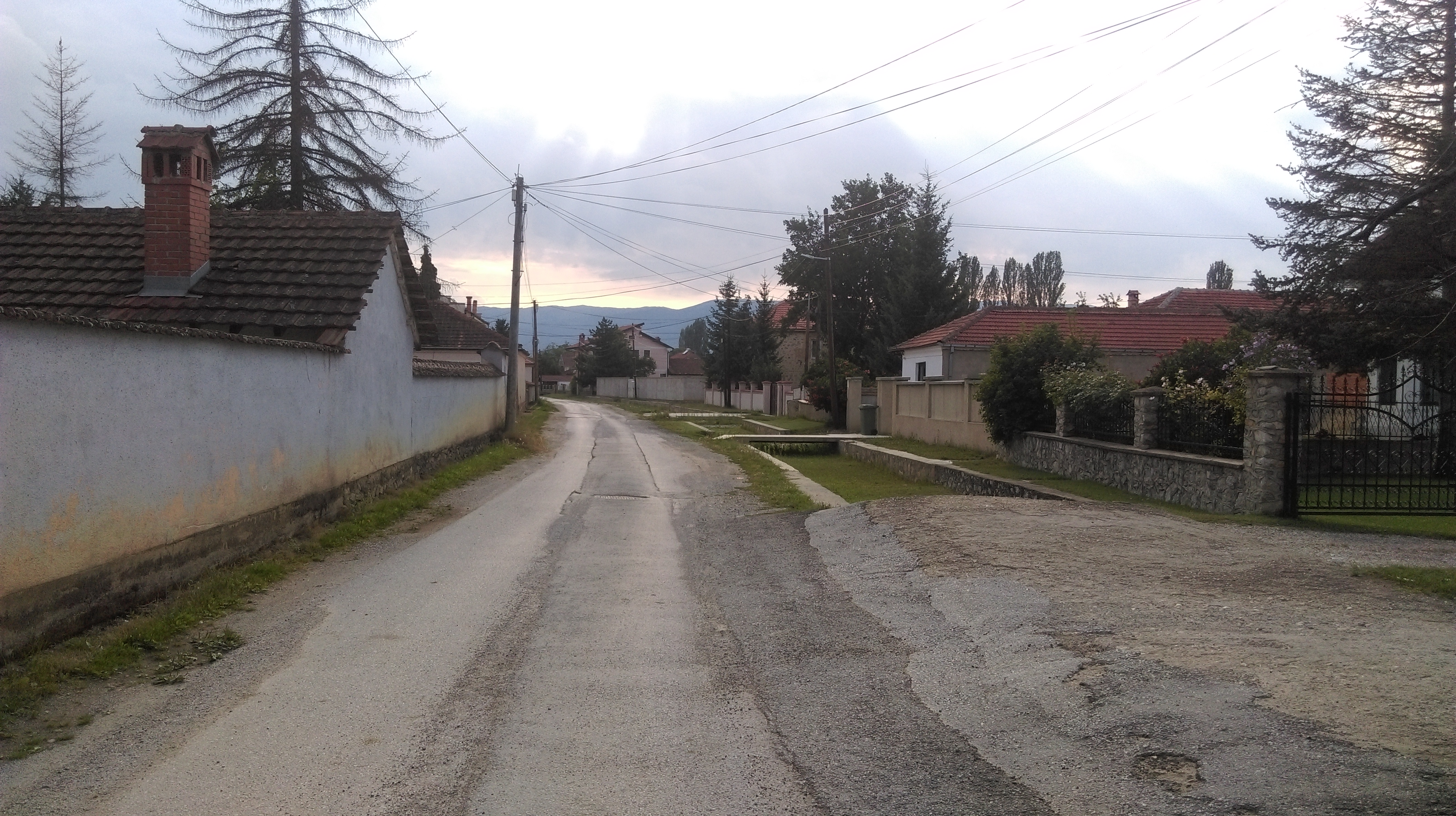
Streetscape in part of Dolna Bela Crkva

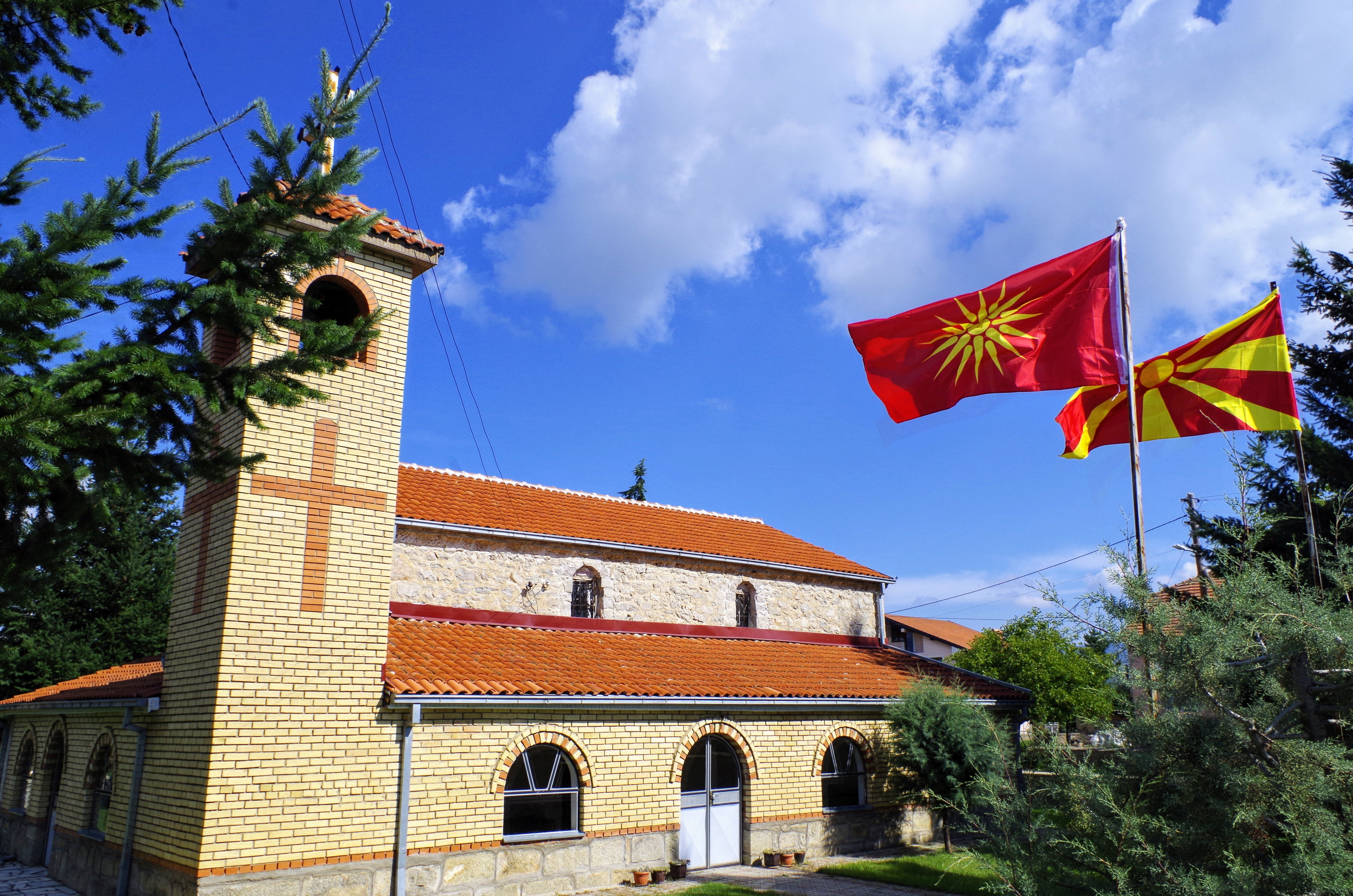
Orthodox church of Dolna Bela Crkva

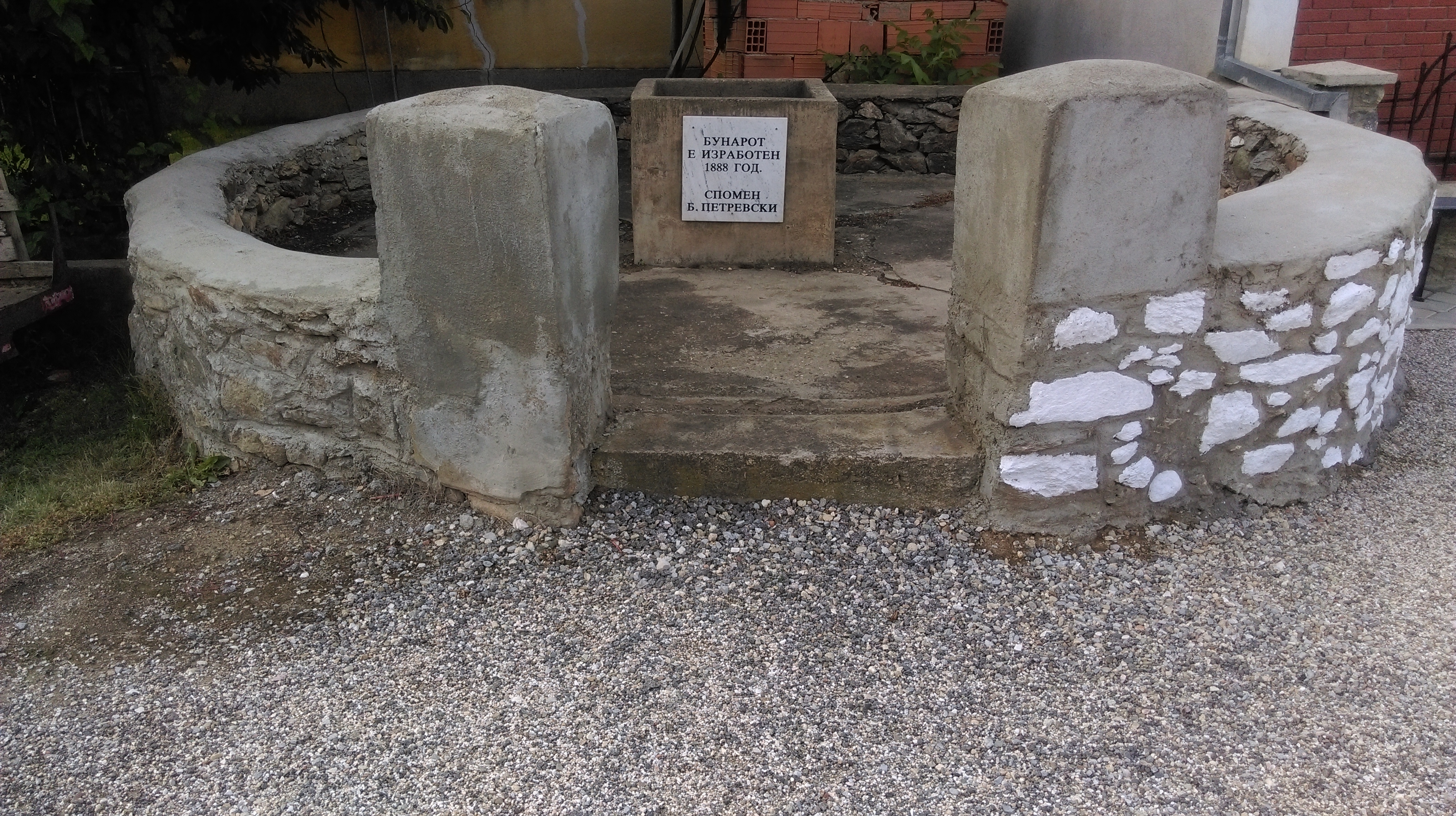
Old village well (built 1888)

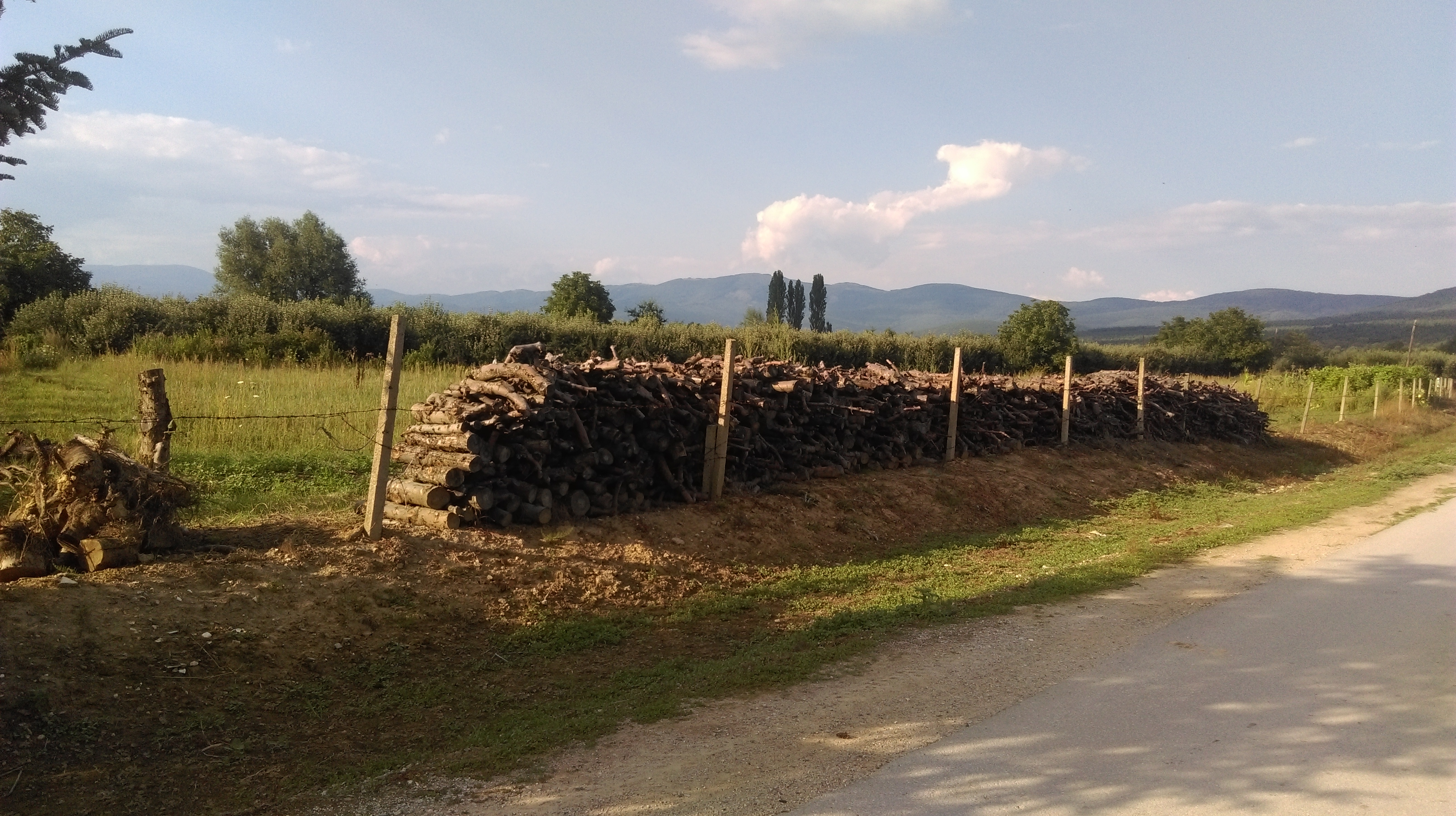
Cut firewood in a field of Dolna Bela Crkva

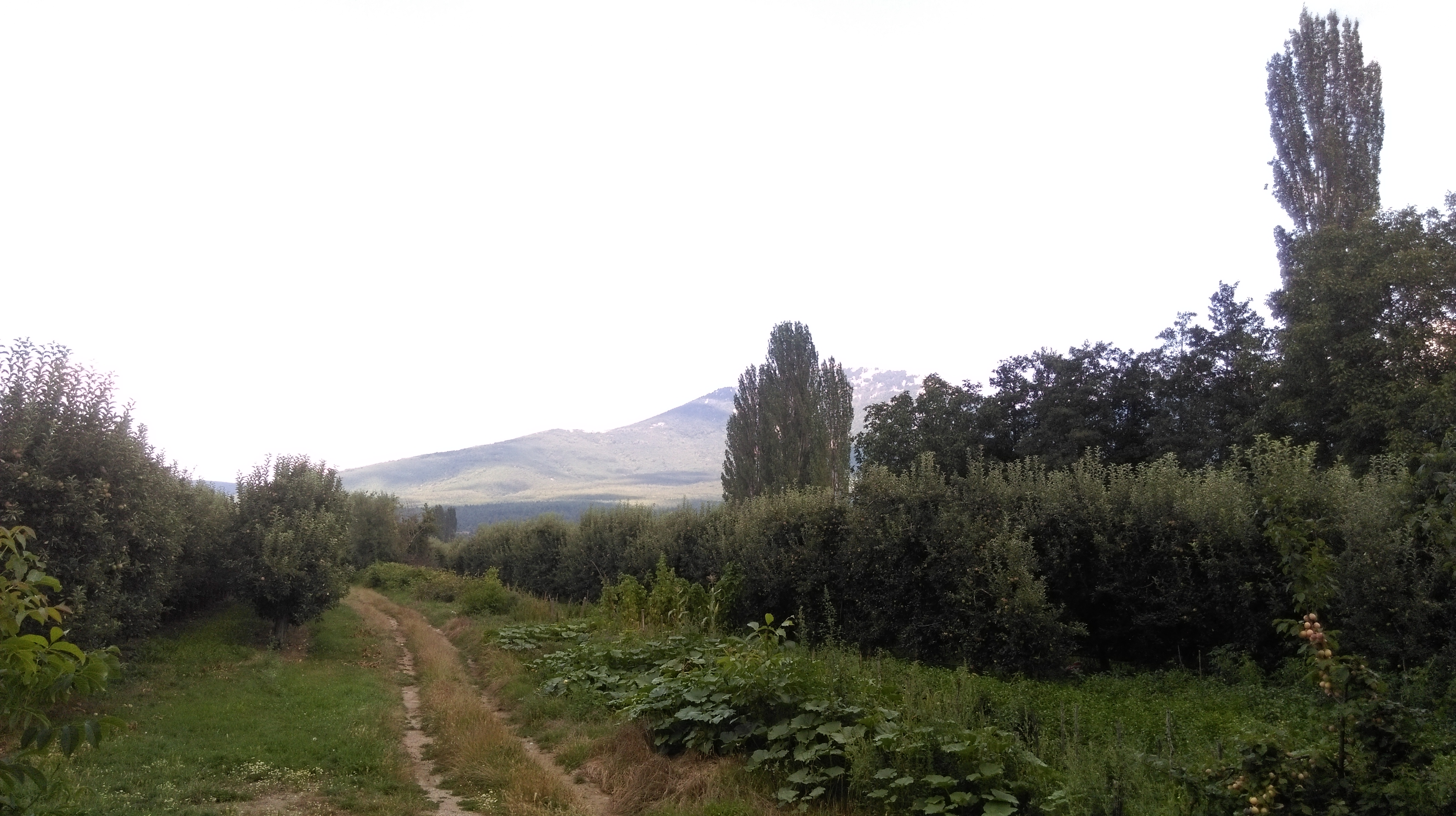
Fields of Dolna Bela Crkva

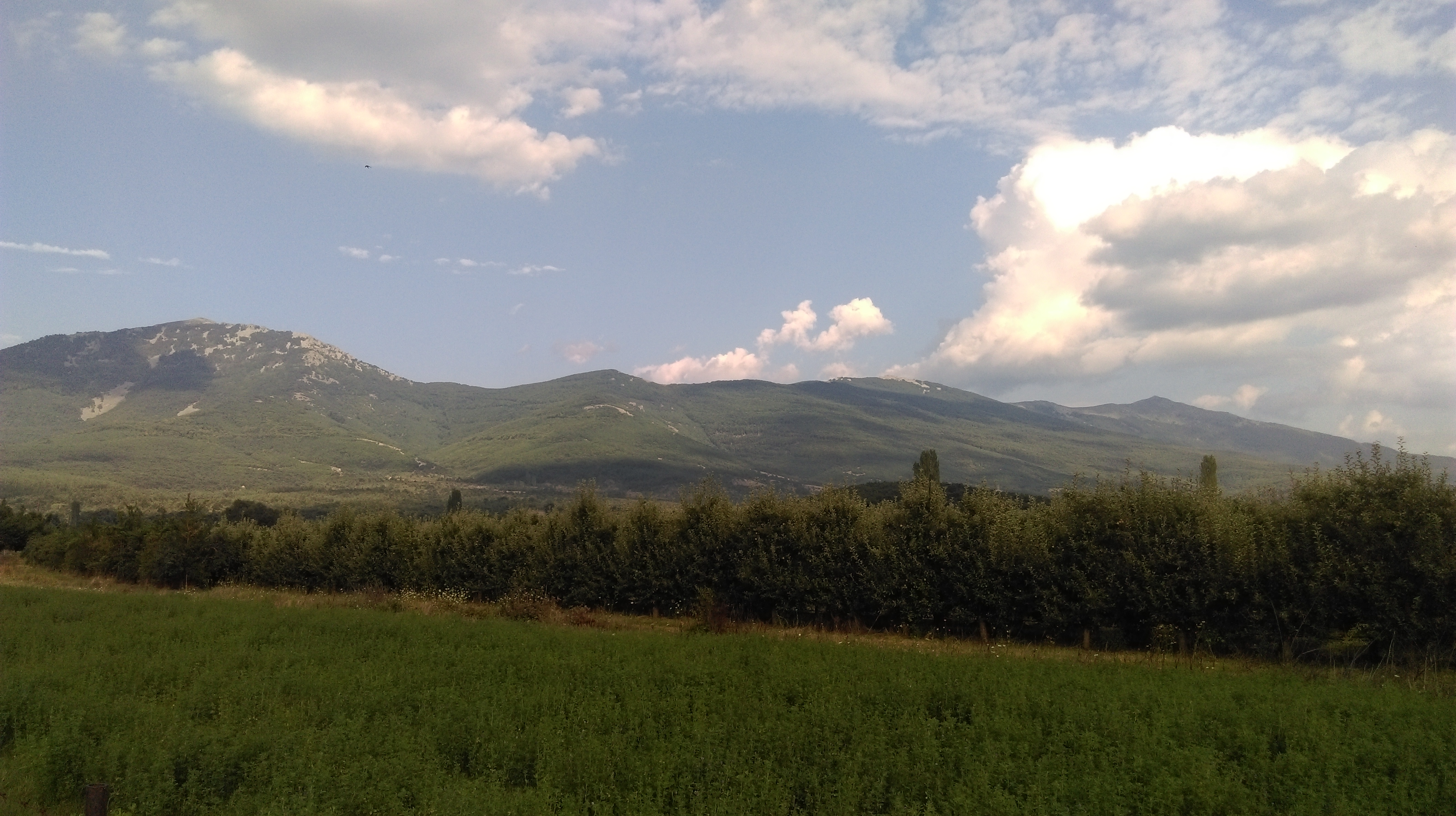
Apple orchard in Dolna Bela Crkva

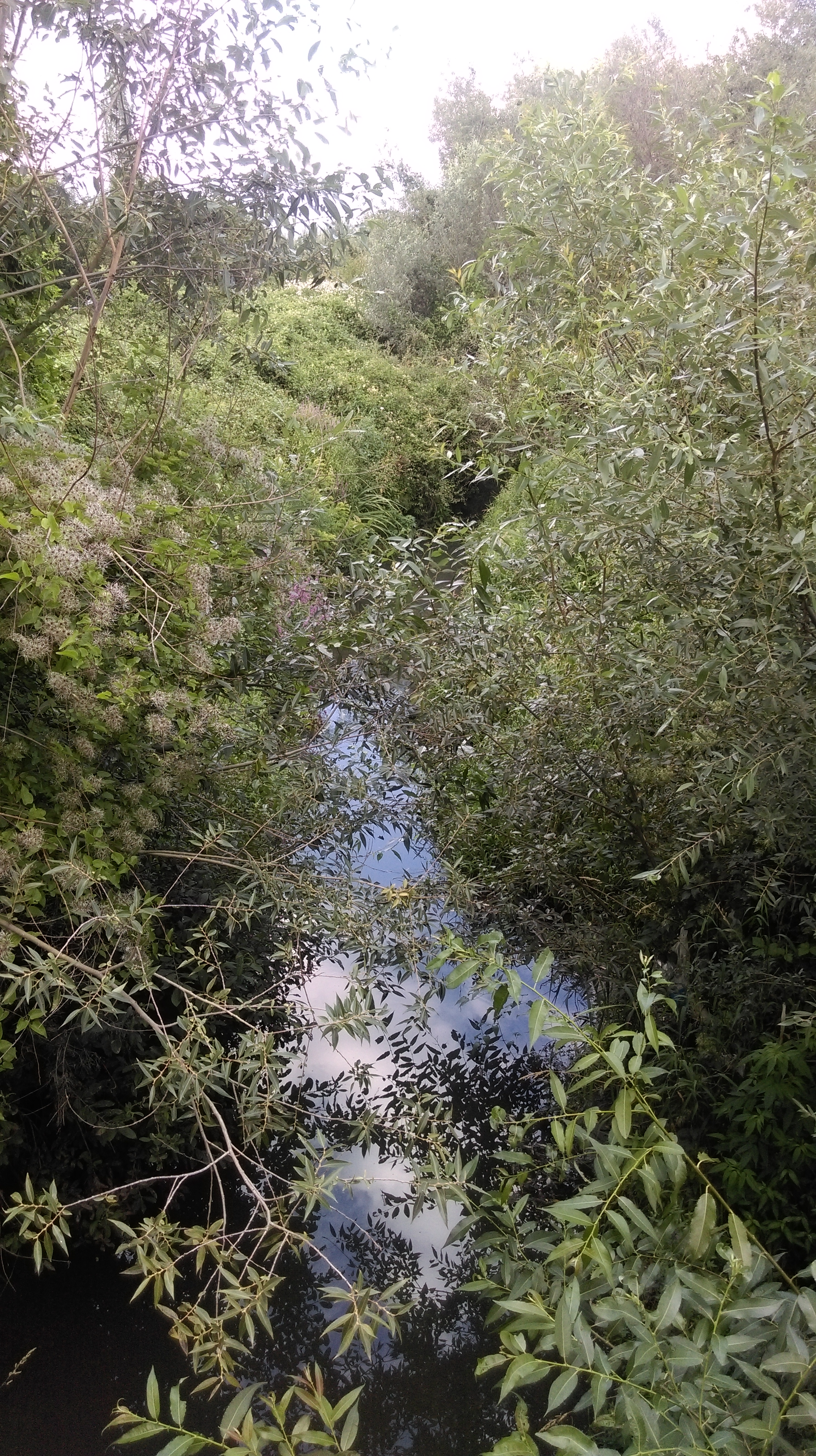
Dolna Bela Crkva river

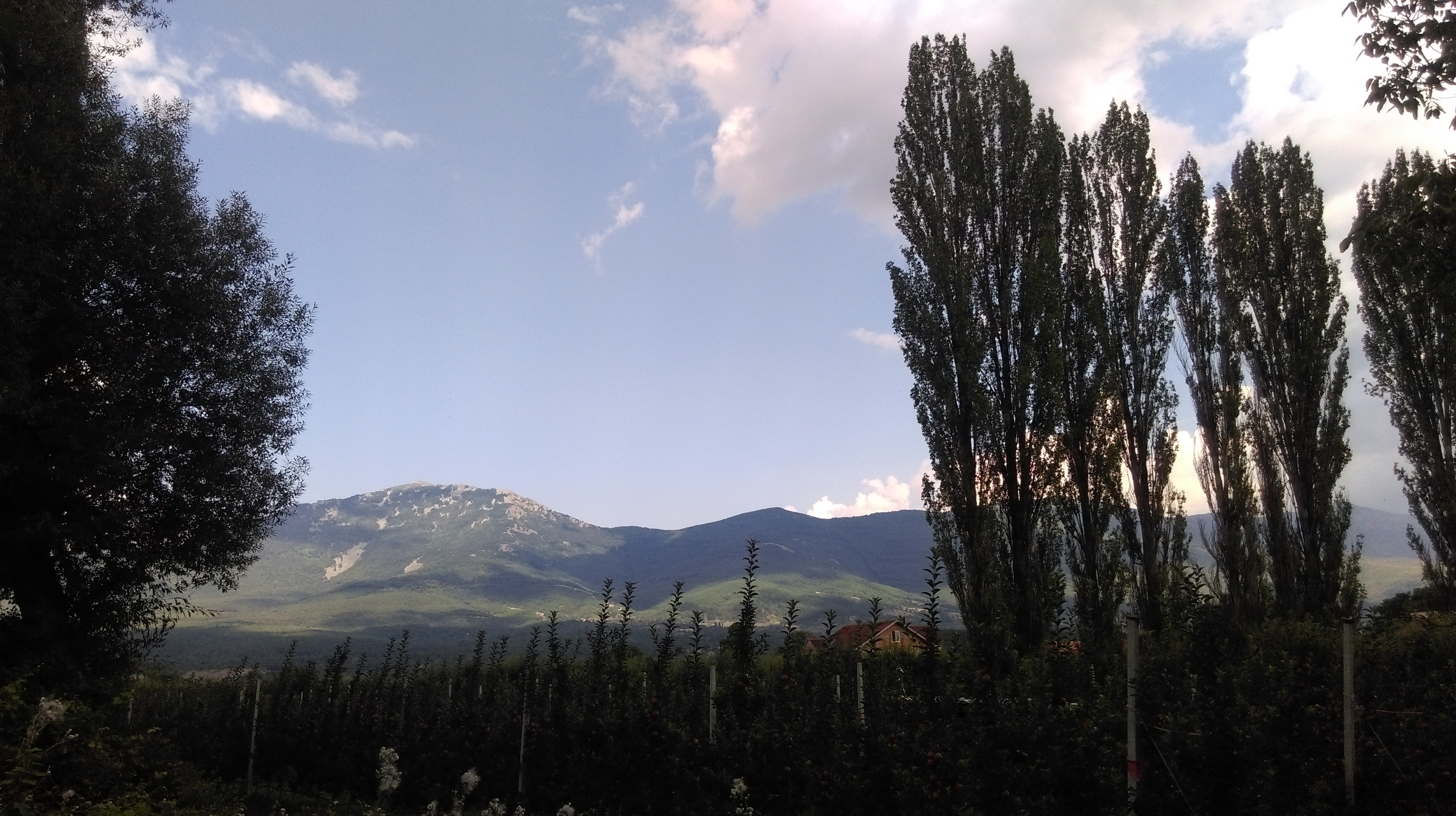
Fields of Dolna Bela Crkva
