= Rajca, Resen =

Rajca Рајца
- Village
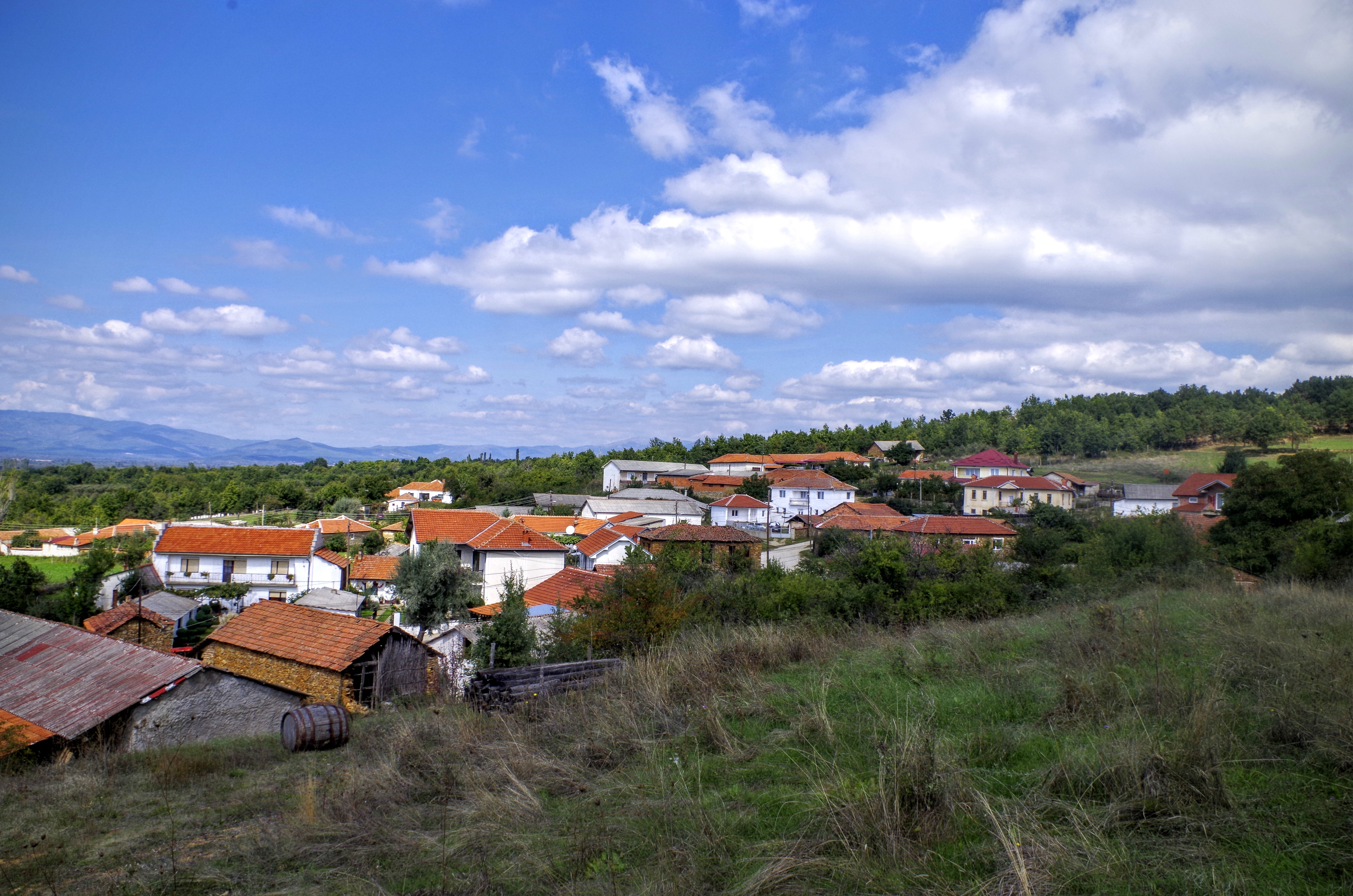
- Rajca

- Location within North Macedonia
- Coordinates: 41°00′08″N 21°03′42″E
- Country: North Macedonia
- Region: Pelagonia
- Municipality: Resen

Population (2002)
  - Total: 66
- Time zone: UTC+1 (CET)
  - Summer (DST): UTC+2 (CEST)
- Area code: +389
- Car plates: RE

Rajca (Macedonian: Рајца) is a village in the Resen Municipality of North Macedonia, northeast of Lake Prespa. The village is located nearly 11 kilometres (6.8 mi) south of the municipal centre of Resen.

== Demographics ==
Rajca has 66 inhabitants as of the most recent census of 2002. The village's population has steadily declined since the 1970s.

Ethnic group	census 1961		census 1971		census 1981		census 1991		census 1994		census 2002	
Ethnic group	Number	%	Number	%	Number	%	Number	%	Number	%	Number	%
Macedonians	155	100	159	100	142	98.6	80	100	72	100	66	100
others	0	0.0	0	0.0	2	1.4	0	0.0	0	0.0	0	0.0
Total	155		159		144		80		72		66	

== Gallery ==
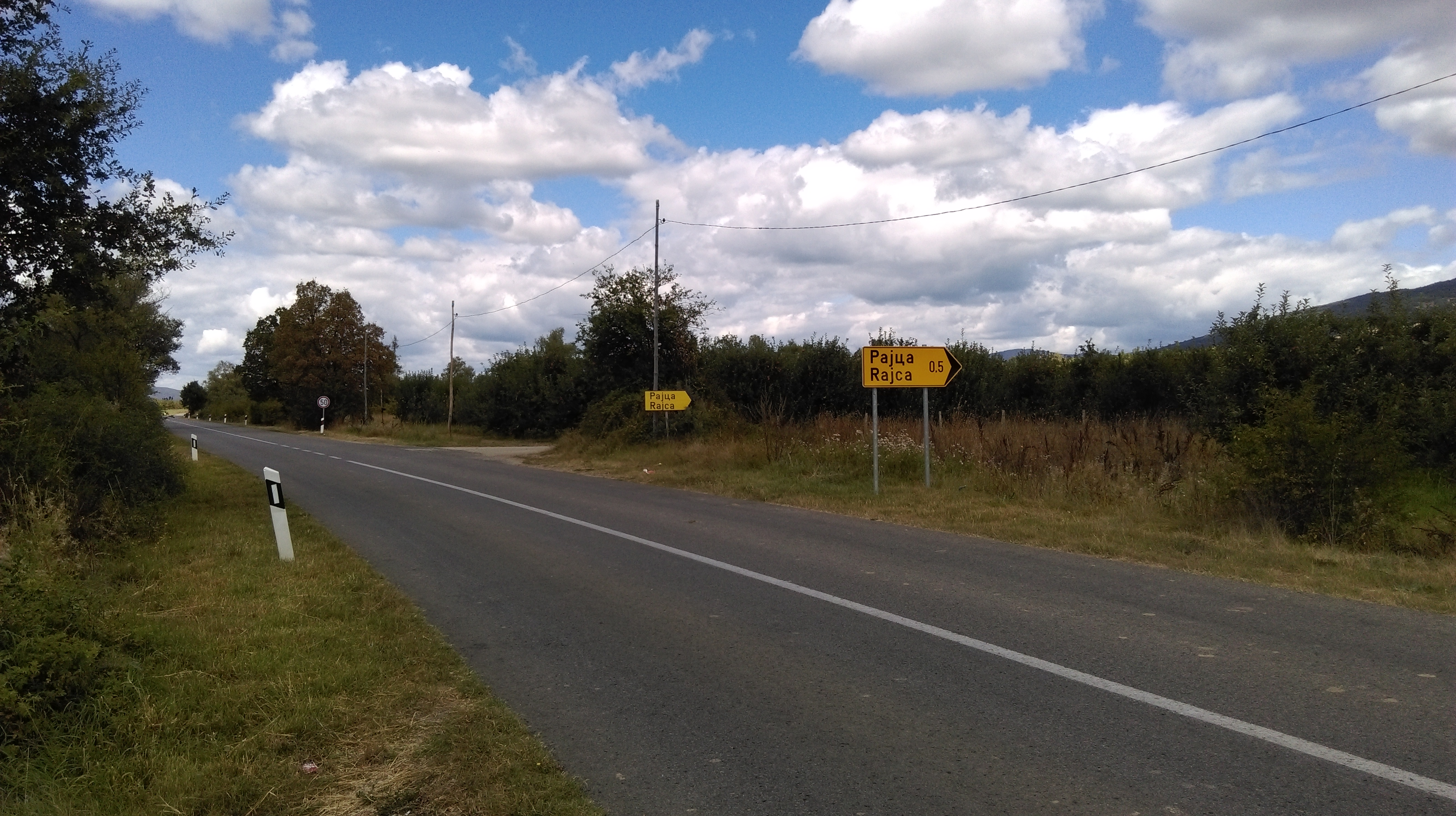
Sign on main road hailing entrance into Rajca

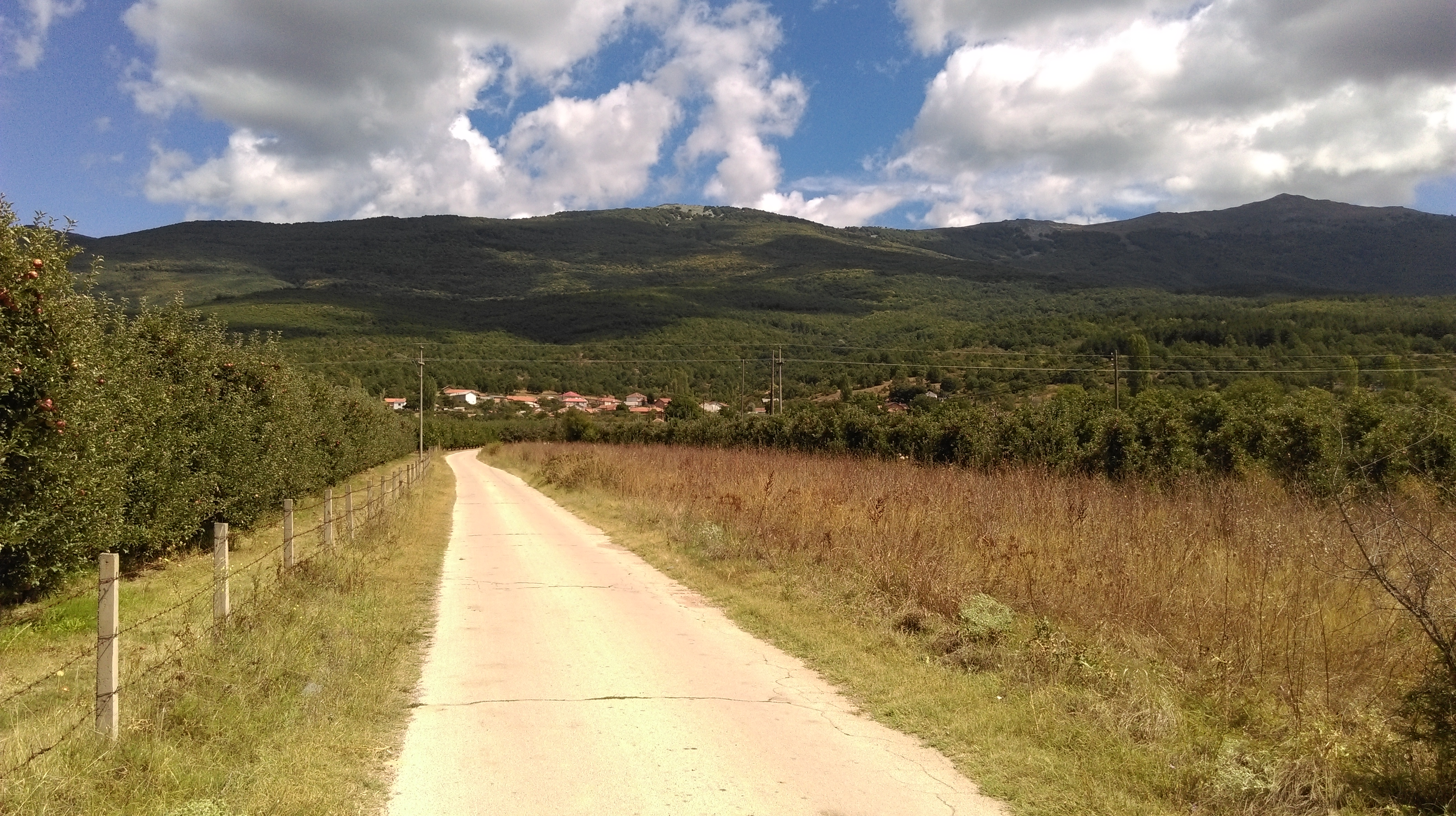
Road into Rajca

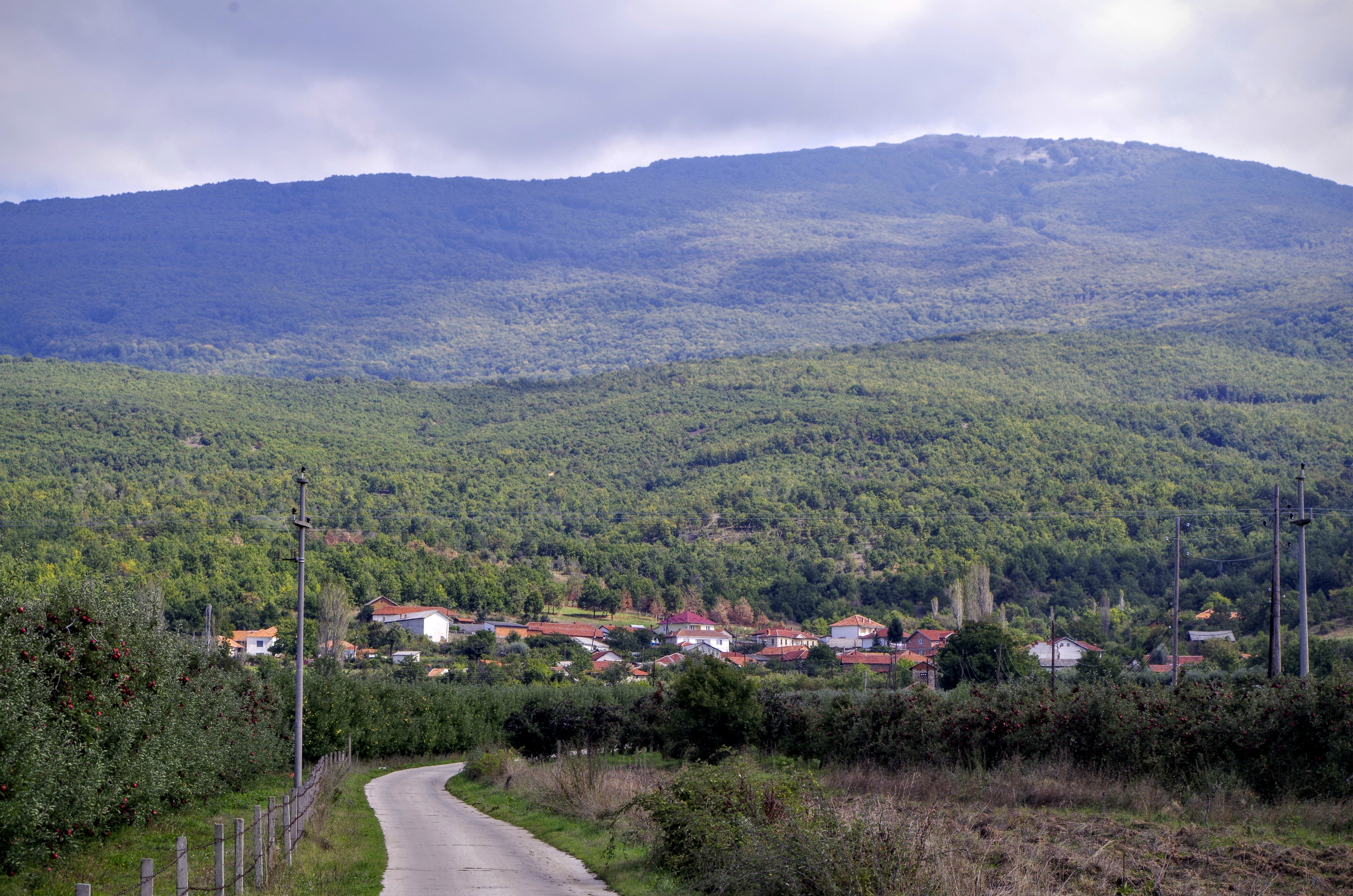
Rajca village

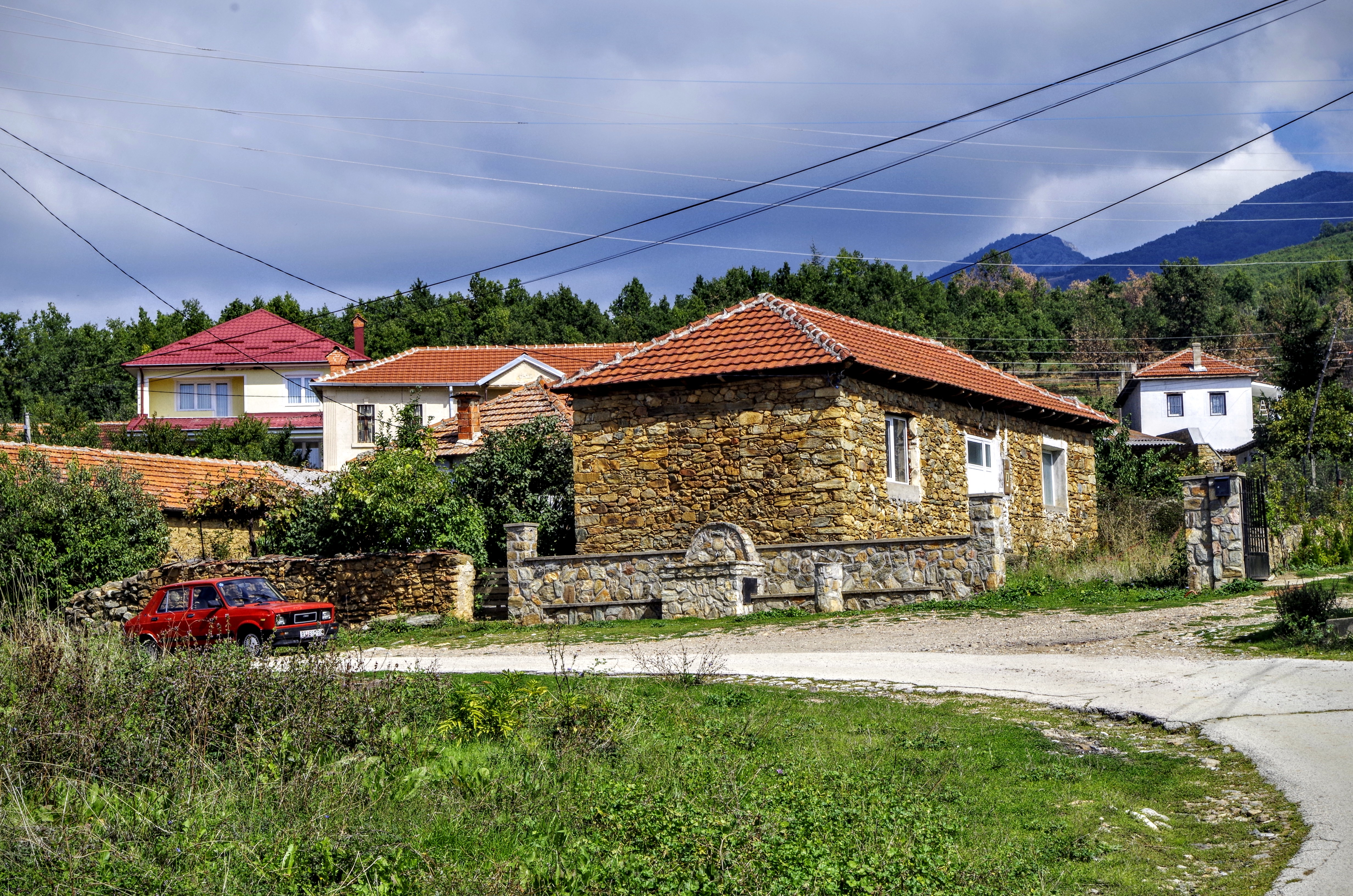
Architecture of Rajca

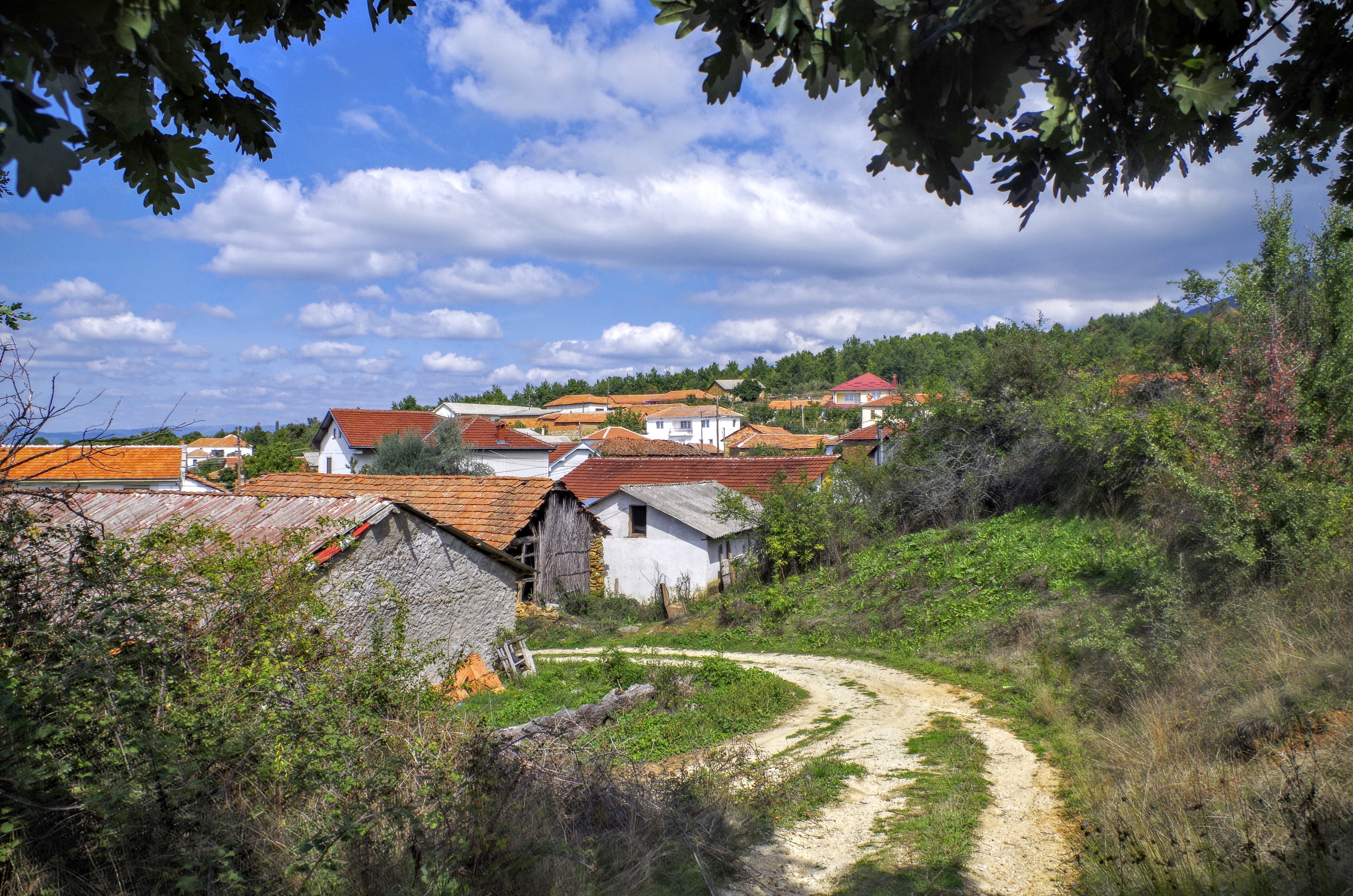
Architecture of Rajca

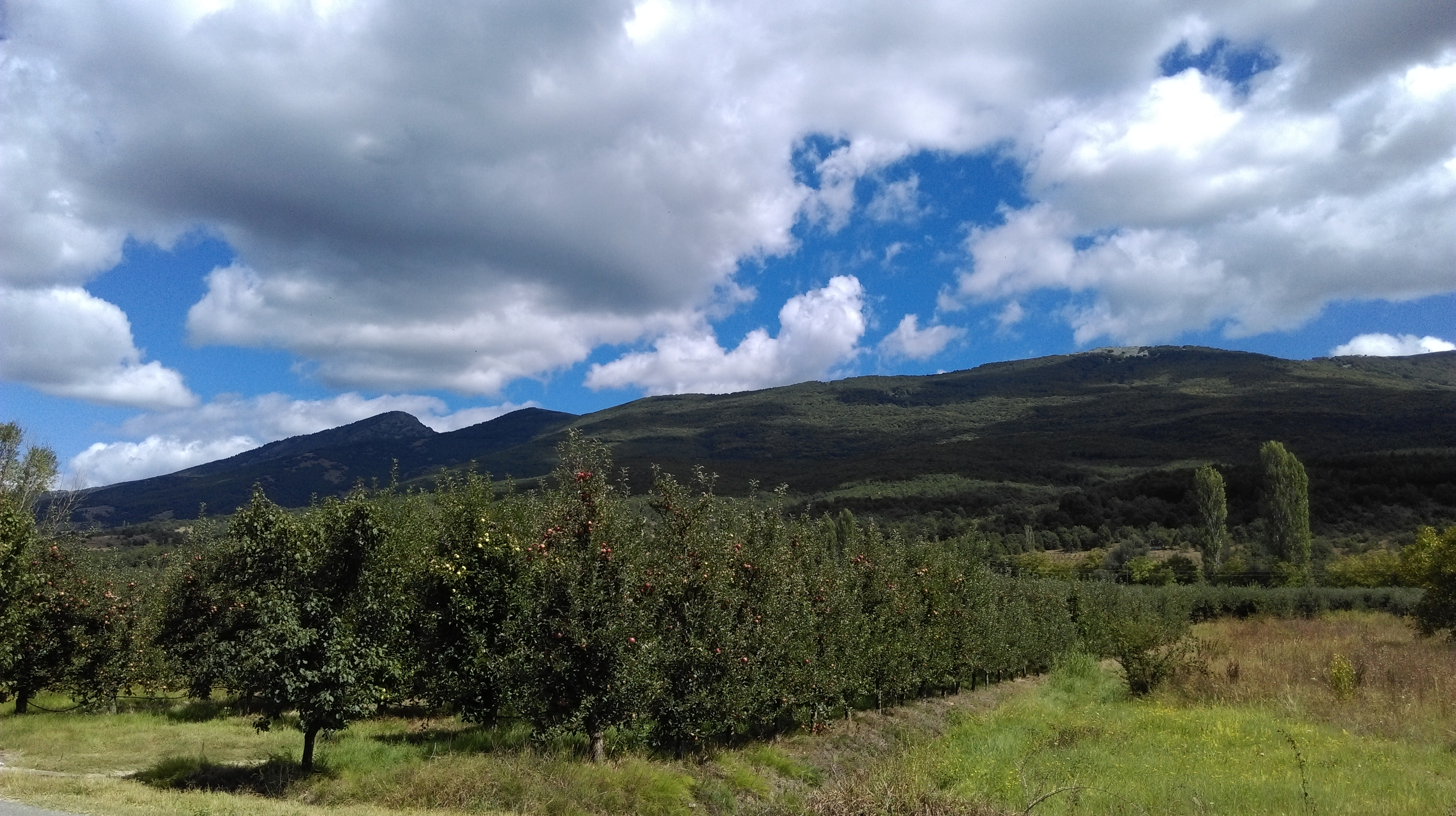
Apple orchard in Rajca with Baba mountains in background

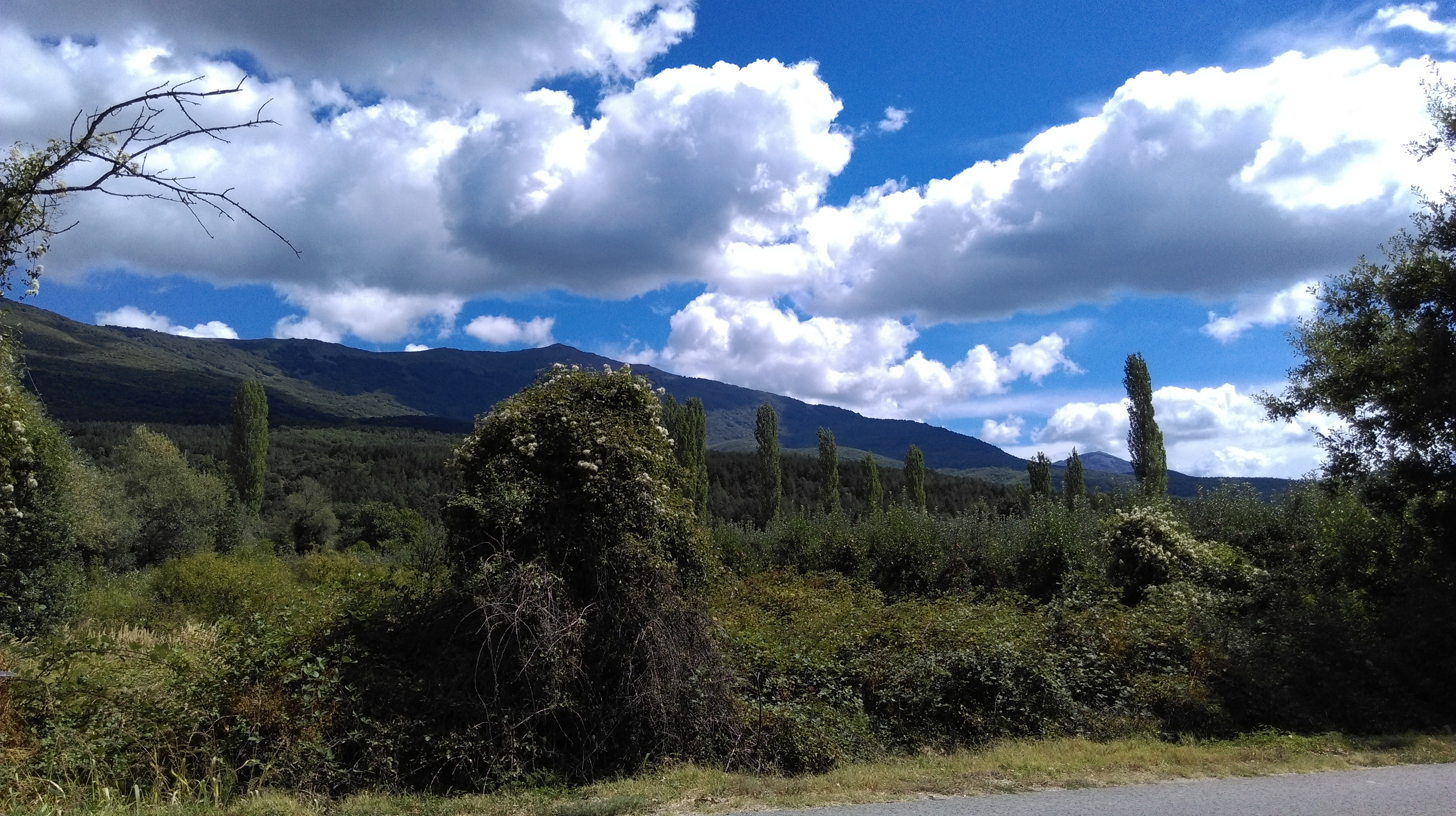
Green vegetation in Rajca with Baba mountains in background

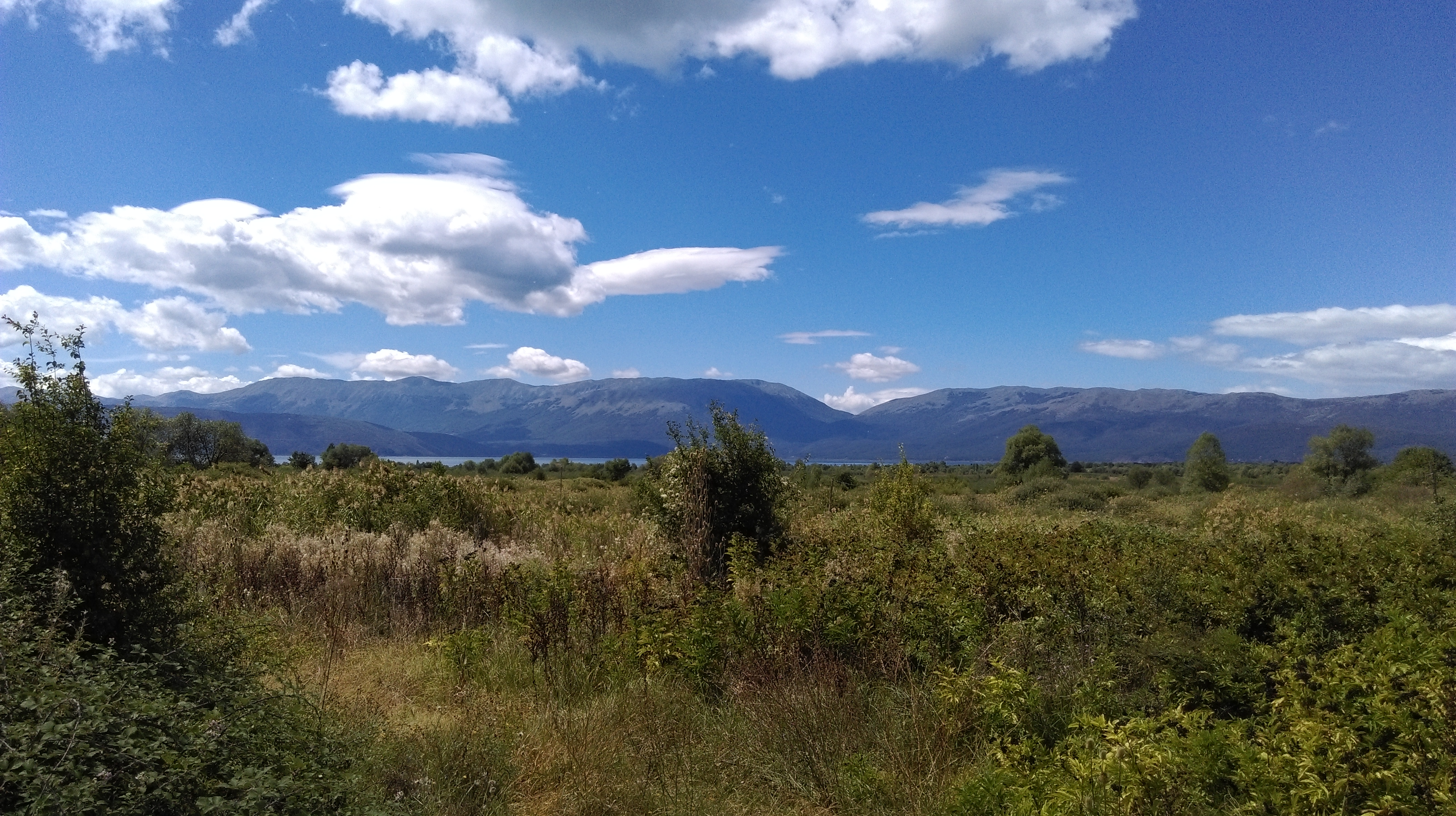
Fields of Rajca with Lake Prespa and Galičica mountains in background

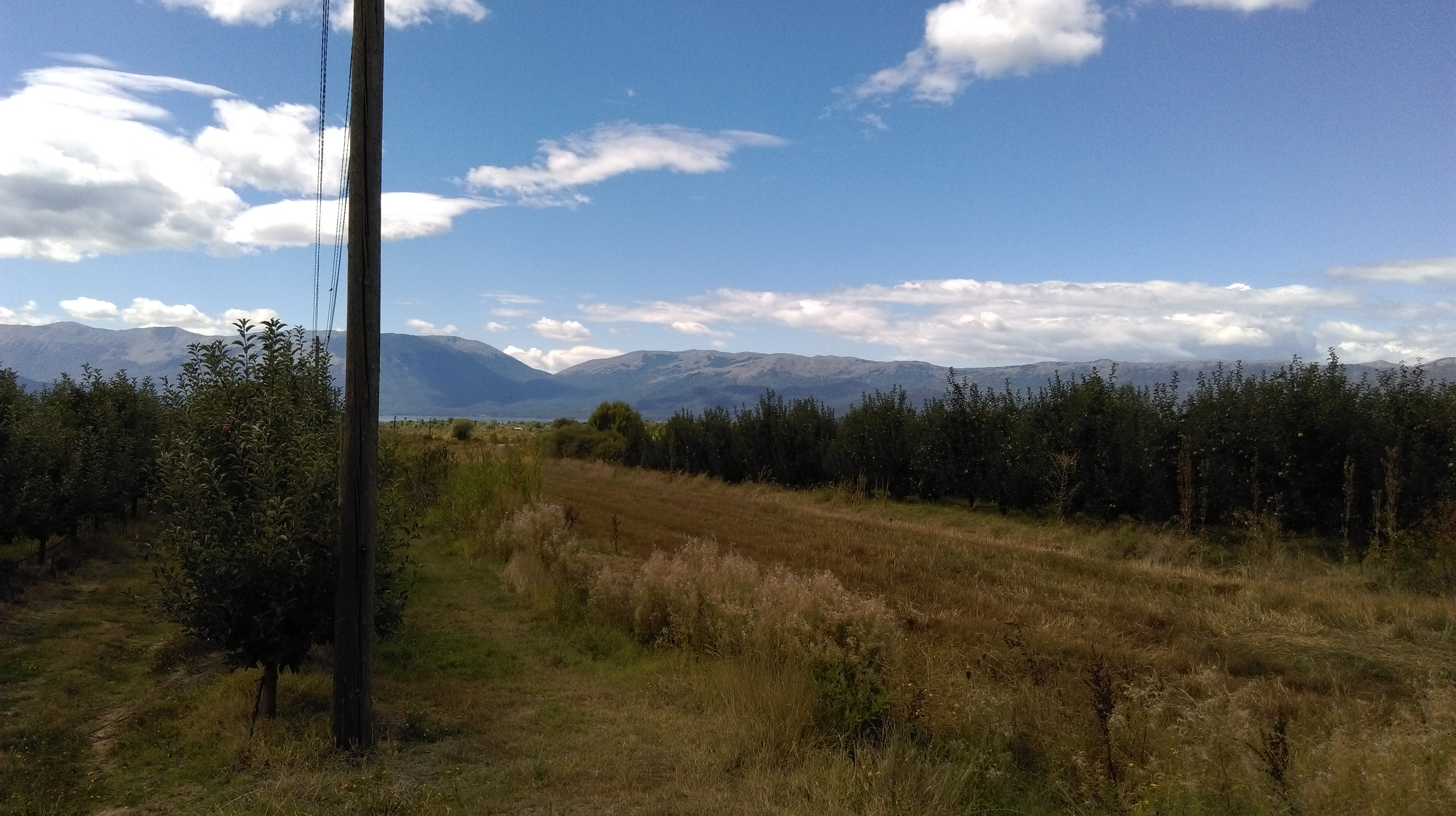
Fields and apple orchards of Rajca

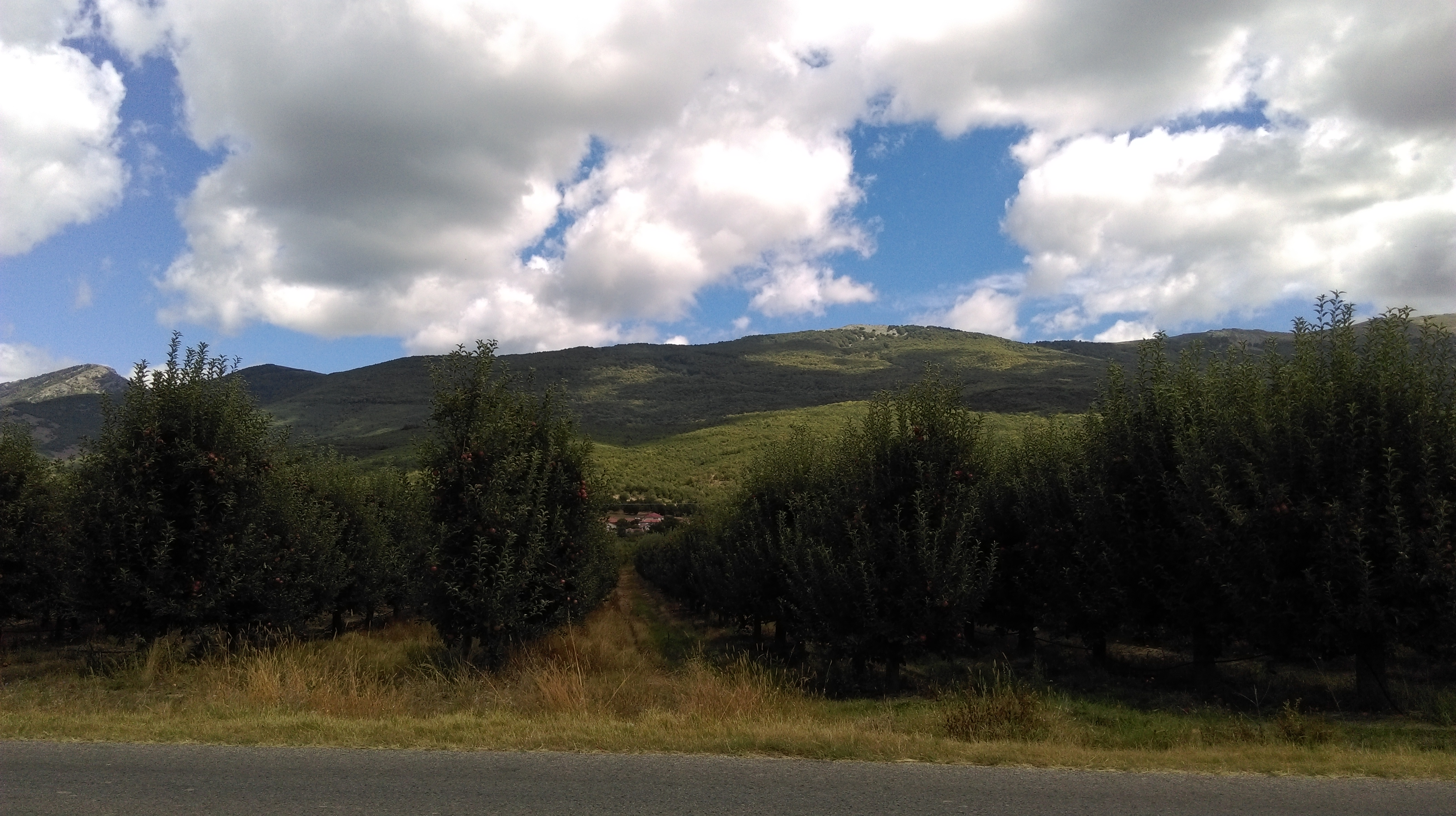
Apple orchards of Rajca

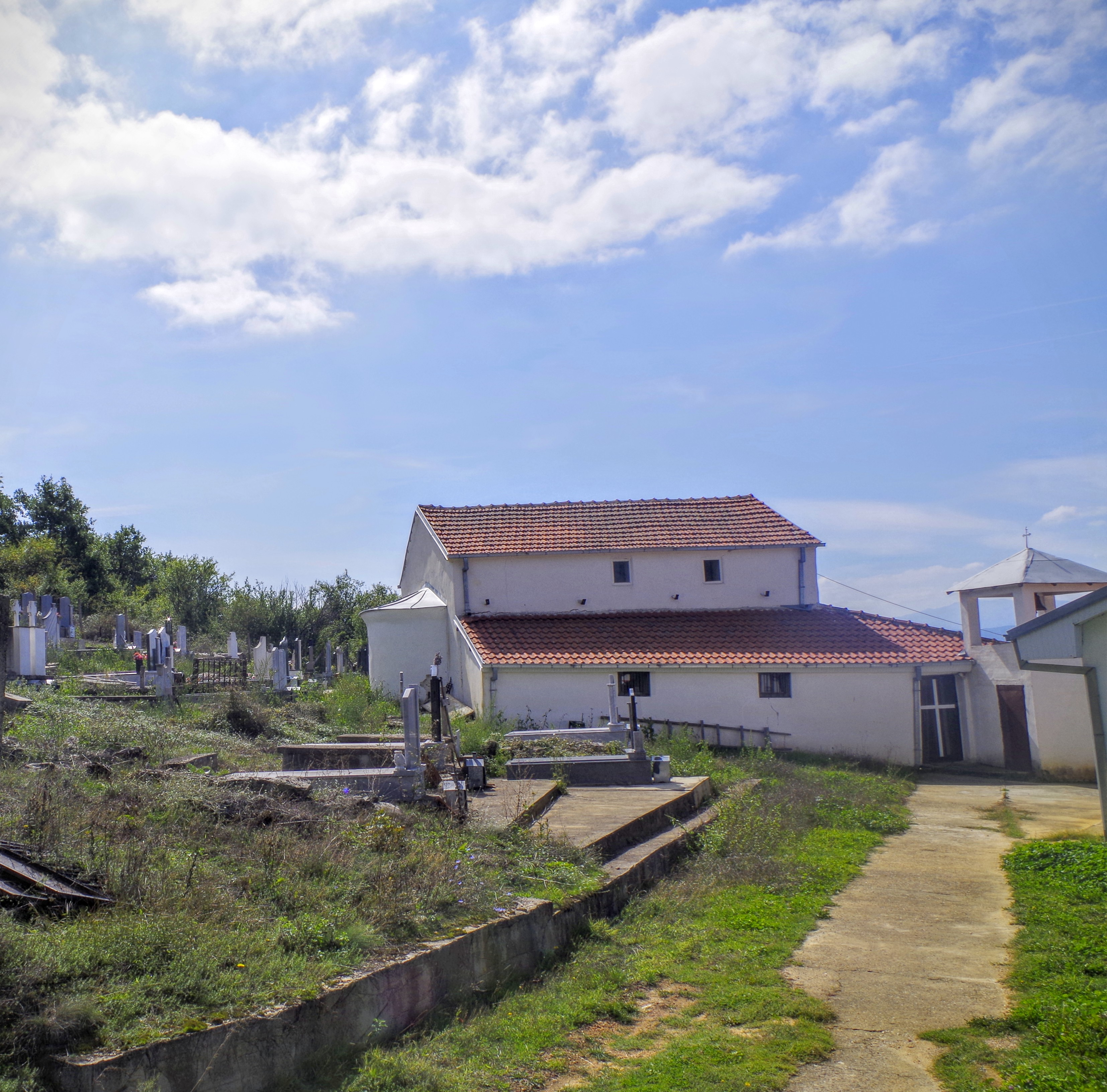
St. Nicholas church and orthodox cemetery of Rajca
