= Drmeni =

Drmeni Дрмени Dırmeni
- Village
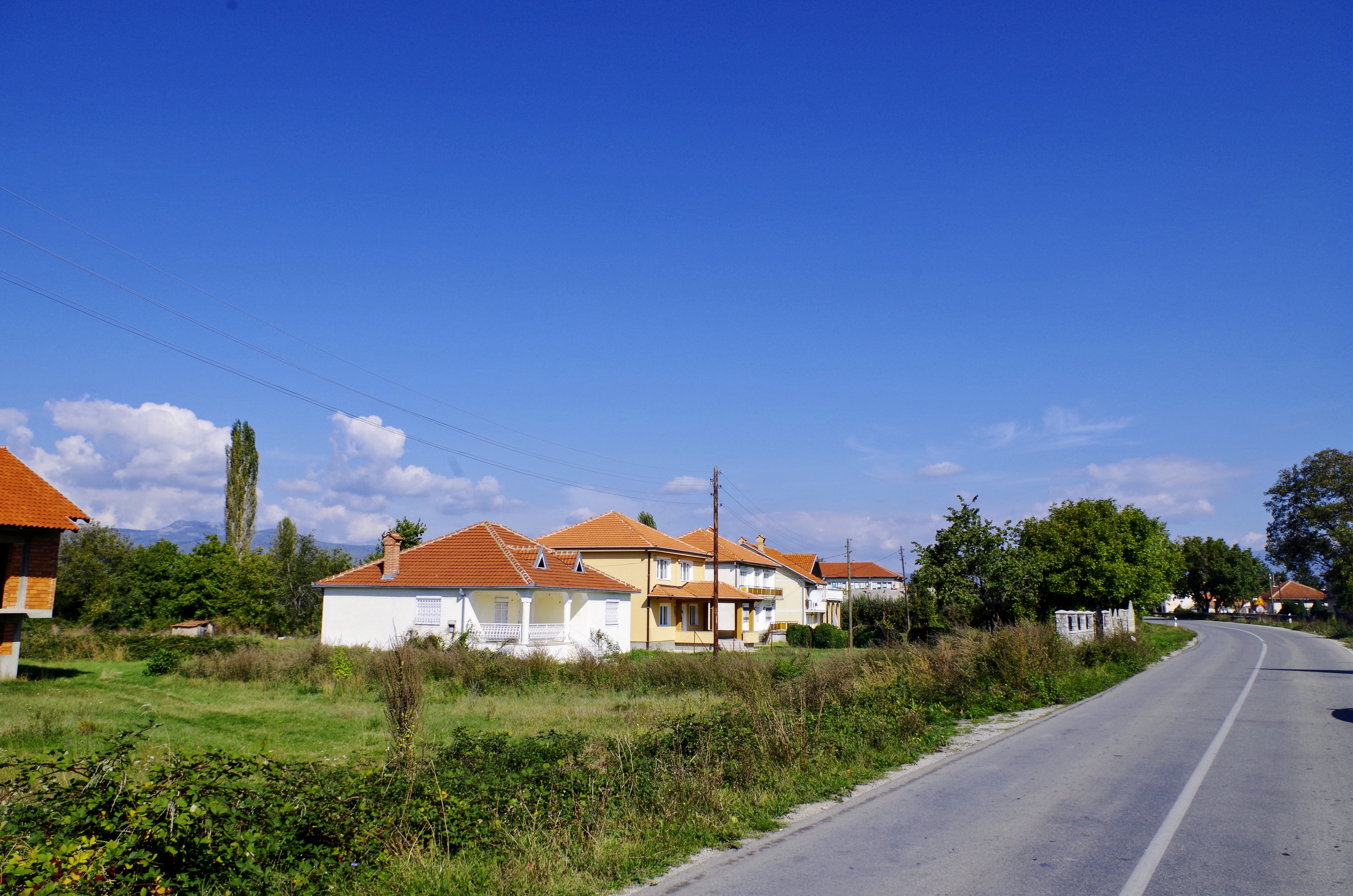
- Houses in the village Drmeni

- Location within North Macedonia
- Coordinates: 41°01′57″N 20°59′54″E
- Country: North Macedonia
- Region: Pelagonia
- Municipality: Resen

Population (2002)
  - Total: 416
- Time zone: UTC+1 (CET)
  - Summer (DST): UTC+2 (CEST)
- Area code: +389
- Car plates: RE

Drmeni (Macedonian: Дрмени, Turkish: Dırmeni) is a village in the Resen Municipality of North Macedonia, north of Lake Prespa. It has 416 residents as of the 2002 census.

== Demographics ==
Drmeni is inhabited by Orthodox Macedonians and Muslim Turks. The Turkish population of Drmeni has declined at a much faster rate than that of the rest of the village population.

Ethnic group	census 1961		census 1971		census 1981		census 1991		census 1994		census 2002	
Ethnic group	Number	%	Number	%	Number	%	Number	%	Number	%	Number	%
Macedonians	721	87.7	723	89.3	693	89.5	741	87.3	447	97.2	404	97.1
Turks	99	12.0	86	10.6	78	10.1	100	11.8	13	2.8	12	2.9
others	2	0.2	1	0.1	3	0.4	8	0.9	0	0.0	0	0.0
Total	822		810		774		849		460		416	
