= Evla =

Evla Евла
- Village
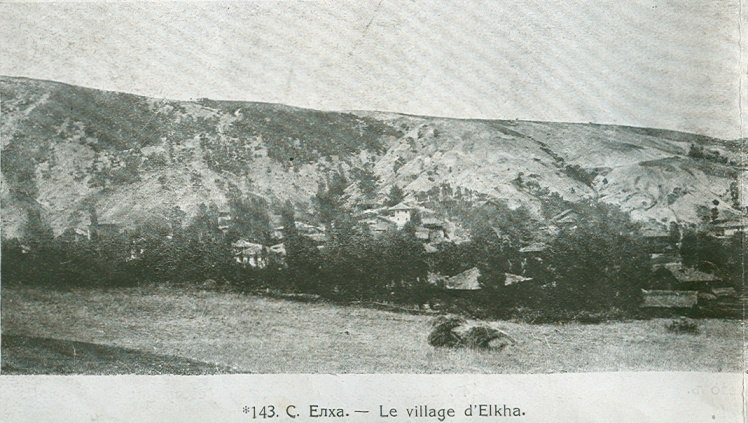
- Evla around 1910

- Location within North Macedonia
- Coordinates: 41°04′28.25″N 20°57′22.42″E
- Country: North Macedonia
- Region: Pelagonia
- Municipality: Resen

Population (2002)
  - Total: 106
- Time zone: UTC+1 (CET)
  - Summer (DST): UTC+2 (CEST)
- Area code: +389
- Car plates: RE

Evla (Macedonian: Евла) is a village in Resen Municipality in North Macedonia. Located in the northern part of the municipality, it is just under 5 km from the municipal centre of Resen.

== Demographics ==
As of the 2002 census, Evla has 106 residents, roughly one-quarter of its 1961 population.

Ethnic group	census 1961		census 1971		census 1981		census 1991		census 1994		census 2002	
Ethnic group	Number	%	Number	%	Number	%	Number	%	Number	%	Number	%
Macedonians	426	100.0	311	99.4	231	99.6	174	99.4	138	100.0	106	100.0
others	0	0.0	2	0.6	1	0.4	1	0.6	0	0.0	0	0.0
Total	426		313		232		175		138		106	
