= Petrino, Resen =

Petrino Петрино
- Village
- Location within North Macedonia
- Coordinates: 41°06′13″N 20°56′47″E
- Country: North Macedonia
- Region: Pelagonia
- Municipality: Resen

Population (2002)
  - Total: 0
- Time zone: UTC+1 (CET)
  - Summer (DST): UTC+2 (CEST)
- Area code: +389
- Car plates: RE

Petrino (Macedonian: Петрино) is a village in the northern part of the Resen Municipality of North Macedonia. The village is 5.6 kilometres (3.5 mi) from the municipal centre of Resen. The village is deserted.

== Demographics ==
The last census in which Petrino still had permanent residents was in 1971.

Ethnic group	census 1961		census 1971		census 1981		census 1991		census 1994		census 2002		census 2021	
Ethnic group	Number	%	Number	%	Number	%	Number	%	Number	%	Number	%	Number	%
Macedonians	98	100	29	100	0	-	0	-	0	-	0	-	0	-
Total	98		29		0		0		0		0		0	
