= Kriveni =

Kriveni Кривени
- Village
- Location within North Macedonia
- Coordinates: 41°08′25″N 21°01′26″E
- Country: North Macedonia
- Region: Pelagonia
- Municipality: Resen

Population (2002)
  - Total: 27
- Time zone: UTC+1 (CET)
  - Summer (DST): UTC+2 (CEST)
- Area code: +389
- Car plates: RE

Kriveni (Macedonian: Кривени) is a village in the northern part of Resen Municipality in North Macedonia. The village is located roughly 5.5 kilometres (3.4 mi) north of the municipal centre of Resen.

== History ==
Just east of the present-day village lies an archaeological site from Late Antiquity, known as Češino. Another site within the village's territory dates from the Roman era.

== Demographics ==
Kriveni has 27 inhabitants as of the most recent census of 2002, having suffered a sharp population decline in the past several decades.

Ethnic group	census 1961		census 1971		census 1981		census 1991		census 1994		census 2002	
Ethnic group	Number	%	Number	%	Number	%	Number	%	Number	%	Number	%
Macedonians	440	99.3	302	100	139	95.9	72	98.6	49	100	27	100
others	3	0.7	0	0.0	6	4.1	1	1.4	0	0.0	0	0.0
Total	443		302		145		73		49		27	

=== Religion ===
Kriveni has one church, dedicated to St George.

== People from Kriveni ==
- Pande Božinovski, soldier in the Spanish Civil War
- Gero Resenski (? - 1905), member of the Internal Macedonian Revolutionary Organization
- Krste Stojanov (1880 - 1905), member of the Internal Macedonian Revolutionary Organization
