= Ilino, Resen =

Ilino Илино
- Village
- Location within North Macedonia
- Coordinates: 41°09′00″N 20°57′32″E
- Country: North Macedonia
- Region: Pelagonia
- Municipality: Resen

Population (2002)
  - Total: 0
- Time zone: UTC+1 (CET)
  - Summer (DST): UTC+2 (CEST)
- Area code: +389
- Car plates: RE

Ilino (Macedonian: Илино) is a village in the northern part of the Resen Municipality of North Macedonia. It is located roughly 8 kilometres (5.0 mi) from the municipal centre of Resen. The village is deserted.

== Demographics ==
The last census in which Ilino still had permanent residents was in 1981.

Ethnic group	census 1961		census 1971		census 1981		census 1991		census 1994		census 2002		census 2021	
Ethnic group	Number	%	Number	%	Number	%	Number	%	Number	%	Number	%	Number	%
Macedonians	22	100	2	100	2	100	0	-	0	-	0	-	0	-
Total	22		2		2		0		0		0		0	
