= Ezerani =

Ezerani Езерани
- Village
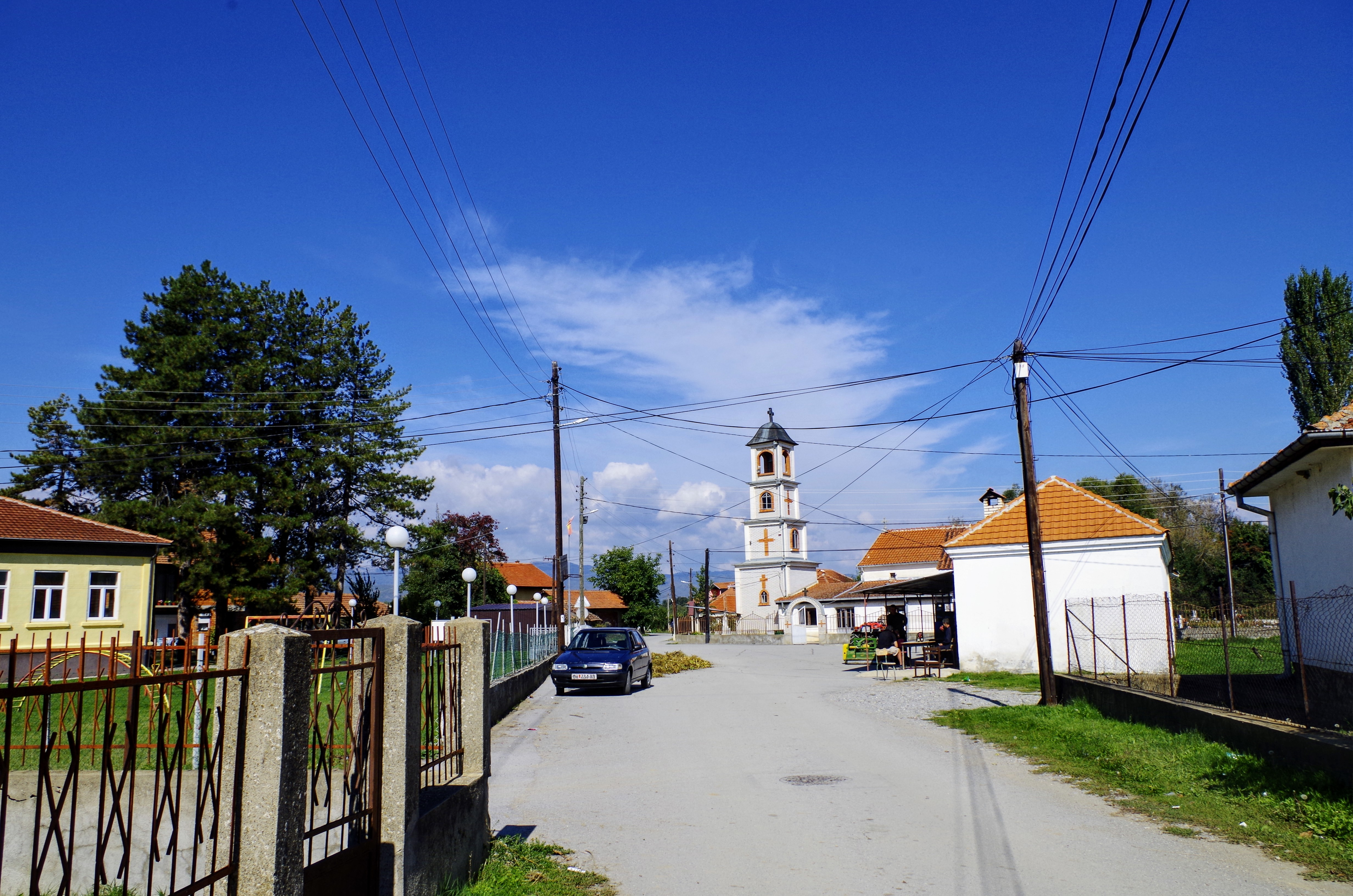
- View of the center of the village

- Location within North Macedonia
- Coordinates: 41°01′26″N 21°01′20″E
- Country: North Macedonia
- Region: Pelagonia
- Municipality: Resen

Population (2002)
  - Total: 203
- Time zone: UTC+1 (CET)
  - Summer (DST): UTC+2 (CEST)
- Area code: +389
- Car plates: RE

Ezerani (Macedonian: Езерани) is a village in the Resen Municipality of North Macedonia, on the northern shore of Lake Prespa. The village is 7 kilometres (4.3 mi) southwest of the municipal centre of Resen.

== Demographics ==
Ezerani has 203 inhabitants as of the most recent census of 2002. Historically populated by ethnic Macedonians, the village has experienced a general population decline over the past several decades.

Ethnic group	census 1961		census 1971		census 1981		census 1991		census 1994		census 2002	
Ethnic group	Number	%	Number	%	Number	%	Number	%	Number	%	Number	%
Macedonians	344	99.7	269	98.9	314	98.7	257	100	217	100	203	100
others	1	0.3	3	1.1	4	1.3	0	0.0	0	0.0	0	0.0
Total	345		272		318		257		217		203	
