= Leva Reka, Resen =

Leva Reka Лева Река
- Village
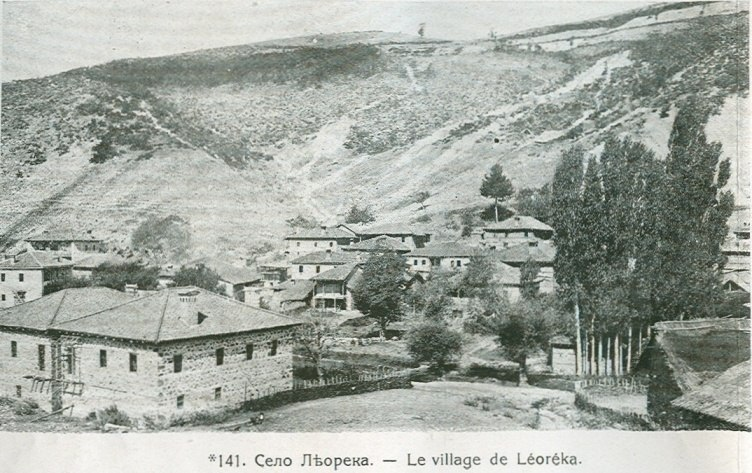
- Leva Reka around 1910

- Location within North Macedonia
- Coordinates: 41°09′30″N 21°00′20″E
- Country: North Macedonia
- Region: Pelagonia
- Municipality: Resen

Population (2002)
  - Total: 60
- Time zone: UTC+1 (CET)
  - Summer (DST): UTC+2 (CEST)
- Area code: +389
- Car plates: RE

Leva Reka (Macedonian: Лева Река) is a village in the northern part of Resen Municipality, in North Macedonia, roughly 7.5 kilometres (4.7 mi) from the municipal centre of Resen. It has 60 residents. The village of Leva Reka has a mountainous terrain, in the centre of the village runs the river known as Leva Reka. Colloquially Leva Reka means 'left river' in Macedonian.

== Demographics ==
Leva Reka's population, as of the 2002 census, is about one-fifth of the village's 1961 population.

Ethnic group	census 1961		census 1971		census 1981		census 1991		census 1994		census 2002	
Ethnic group	Number	%	Number	%	Number	%	Number	%	Number	%	Number	%
Macedonians	312	100.0	206	99.5	201	98.0	118	99.2	72	98.6	59	98.3
others	0	0.0	1	0.5	4	2.0	1	0.8	1	1.4	1	1.7
Total	312		207		205		119		73		60	

== People from Leva Reka ==
- Spiro Levorečki, member of the Internal Macedonian Revolutionary Organization
