= Resen Municipality =

Municipality of Northern Macedonia

Coordinates: 41.0889°N 21.0122°E

Municipality of Resen Општина Ресен
- Urban municipality
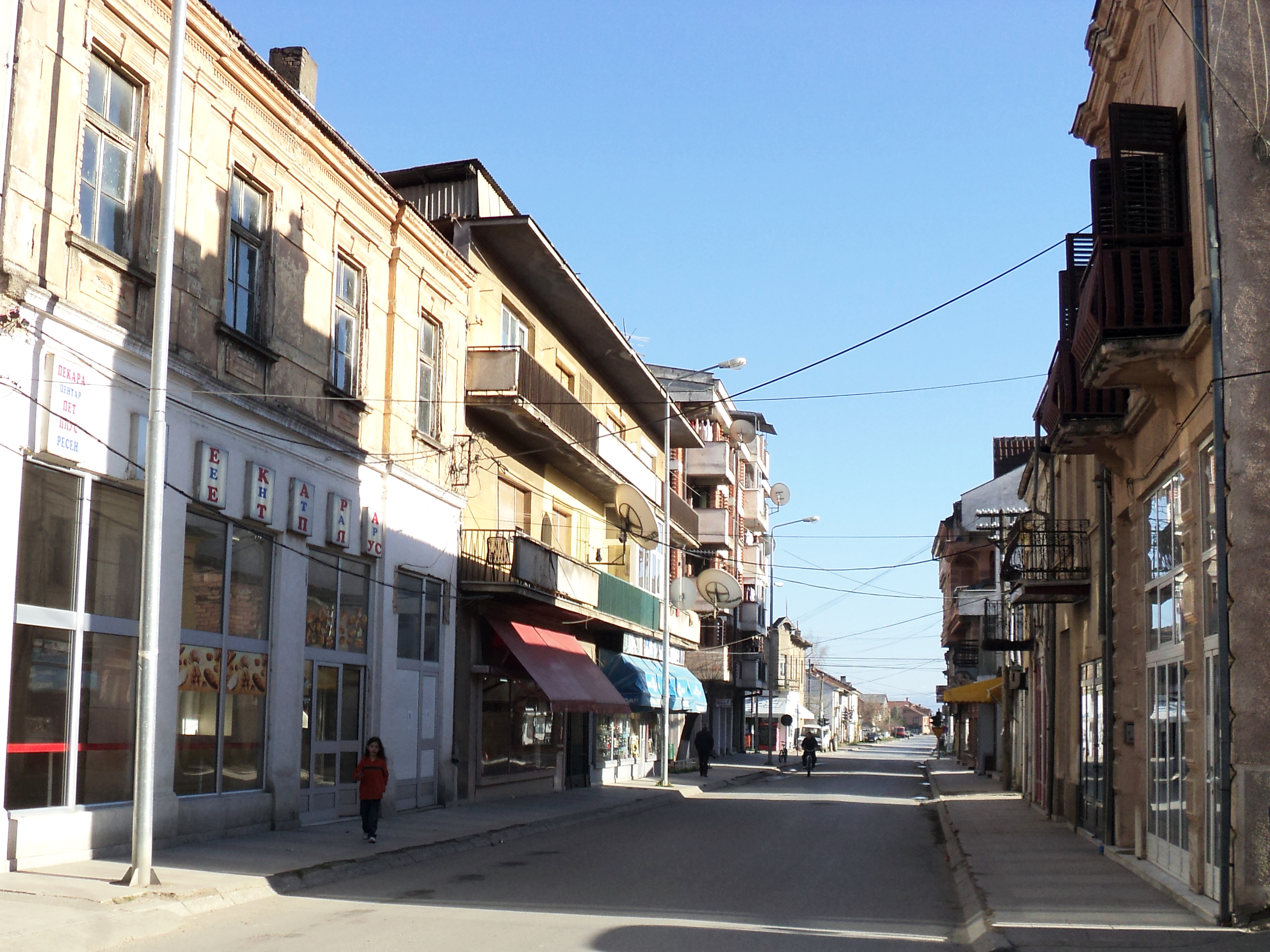
- Resen in April 2011

- Flag Coat of arms

- Country: North Macedonia
- Region: Pelagonia
- Municipal seat: Resen

Government
  - Mayor: Jovan Tozievski (VMRO-DPMNE)

Population
  - Total: 14,373
- Time zone: UTC+1 (CET)
- Vehicle registration: RE
- Website: http://www.resen.gov.mk/

Resen (Macedonian: Ресен [ˈrɛːsɛn]) is a municipality in southwestern Republic of North Macedonia. Resen is also the name of the town where the municipal seat is found. Resen Municipality is located in the Pelagonia Statistical Region.

== Geography ==
The municipality borders Ohrid Municipality to the west, Demir Hisar Municipality to the northeast, Bitola Municipality to the east, and Greece and Albania to the south.

== Demographics ==
Settlements in Resen Municipality

According to the 2021 North Macedonia census, Resen Municipality has 14,373 inhabitants.

Demographics of Resen Municipality
Census year	Population
1994	17,681
2002	16,825
2021	14,373

Ethnic groups in the municipality include:

	2002		2021	
	Number	%	Number	%
TOTAL	16,825	100	14,373	100
Macedonians	12,798	76.07	10,130	70.48
Turks	1,797	10.68	1,457	10.14
Albanians	1,536	9.13	1,381	9.61
Roma	184	1.09	314	2.18
Serbs	74	0.44	70	0.49
Vlachs	26	0.15	44	0.31
Bosniaks	1	0.01	12	0.08
Other / Undeclared / Unknown	409	2.43	254	1.76
Persons for whom data are taken from administrative sources			711	4.95

Religious affiliation according to the 2002 Macedonia census and 2021 North Macedonia census:

	2002		2021	
	Number	%	Number	%
TOTAL	16,825	100	14,373	100
Orthodox	12,599	74.9	5,085	71.0
Christians	2	0.01	5,106	71.0
Catholics	16	0.10	14	71.0
Islam	3,927	23.3	3,423	23.8
Others	281	1.67	34	0.24
Persons for whom data are taken from administrative sources			791	4.95

- Mother tongues according to the 2002 Macedonia census in the municipality include:
  - Macedonian = 12,943 (76.9%)
  - Albanian = 1,885 (11.2%)
  - Turkish = 1,766 (10.5%)
  - Roma = 113 (0.7%)
  - others.

Orthodox Macedonians inhabit all populated settlements in the municipality of Resen. During the late Ottoman period, Torbeš used to reside in Podmočani and Slivnica, although the villages are now wholly populated by Orthodox Macedonians.

In Resen proper, a sizable amount of the Orthodox Macedonian population originates from the villages of Podmočani, Bolno, Malovišta and other villages from the Lake Ohrid area who settled in Resen during the middle of the 19th century. Orthodox Aromanians live, in small numbers, in Resen and in the village of Jankovec.

Most of the Muslim population living in Resen, in addition to those living in Drmeni, Carev Dvor, Lavci, Kozjak and some families in Grnčari and Gorna Bela Crkva speaks Turkish. In the late Ottoman period, a few Turks used to also reside in the village of Nakolec. The Turkish population in the Prespa region is believed by scholars to either be descended from Turks settled in strategic areas or the descendants of local Turkified Slavs during Ottoman rule.

Demographic map of the municipality of Resen, 2002 census

The presence of Muslim Albanians in the Lake Prespa region dates to the Ottoman period consisting of southern Albanians (Tosks) who arrived from various areas of southern Albania, while some families consider their presence in the Prespa region to be indigenous. The speech and folklore of Prespa Albanians (Presparë) is similar to that of the Devoll and Korçë regions in Albania. Albanian-speaking Muslims are located in small numbers in Kozjak, Sopotsko, and Gorna Bela Crkva while forming a significant part of the village population in Dolna Bela Crkva, Grnčari, Krani, Arvati, Asamati and Nakolec.

During the Ottoman period the now former village of Bukovo (Albanian: Bukovë), a Macedonian settlement that later became populated only with Torbeš and Albanians became depopulated after they left the village during the Balkan Wars (1912-1913). Of settlements with Prespa Muslim Albanians most are Sunni, except in Gorna Bela Crkva. A small number of Bektashi Albanians, known locally as Kolonjarë (people of Kolonjë) who trace their arrival from the region of Kolonjë, southern Albania between the late 18th and early 19th century lived in Ljubojno, Nakolec and Krani.

After the fall of the Ottoman empire and some population movements Kolonjarë inhabit Gorna Bela Crkva, Dolna Bela Crkva and Asamati. The Albanian population in Resen settled there during the first decades of the 19th century originating from the Yanya vilayet. In contemporary times Muslim Albanians live in small numbers within Resen. A small number of Albanian speaking Muslim Romani used to live in Krani and Nakolec which during the latter decades of the 20th century have migrated to Ohrid and Resen.

Traditionally a class and religious divide existed between the Bektashi Kolonjarë who formed the local former ruling Ottoman elite or bejlerë and now contemporary Prespa Albanian intelligentsia and Sunni Albanians villagers, referred to by Kolonjarë as arbutë (peons, commoners) or të vêndë (locals).

Sunni Albanians from Sopotsko, Grnčari and Dolna Bela Crkva traditionally highlighted their religious identity over a linguistic one having closer economic and social relations with local Turks and Torbeš and being distant from Orthodox Macedonians. Differences between both Bektashi and Sunni Prespa Albanian communities over time have disappeared through intermarriage and closer communal and cultural relations. The local Prespa dialect of Tosk Albanian being on the periphery of Albanian speech has been strongly influenced by the Macedonian language resulting in the loss of vowel length and the phoneme h, while the alveolar trill (Albanian: rr, /r/) has merged into the alveolar tap (Albanian: r /ɾ/).

== Inhabited places ==
There are 41 inhabited places in this municipality.

Inhabited Places	Total	Macedonians	Albanians	Turks	Roma	Vlachs	Serbs	Bosnians	Others
Resen Municipality	14,373	10,130	1,381	1,457	314	44	70	12	965
Resen	7904	5357	374	1084	294	29	49	8	479
Arvati	119	37	82	0	0	0	0	0	4
Asamati	168	55	91	16	0	0	0	0	6
Bolno	195	191	0	0	0	0	0	0	4
Brajchino	68	61	0	0	0	0	2	1	4
Volkoderi	88	85	0	0	0	0	0	1	2
Gorna Bela Crkva	213	9	109	88	0	0	0	0	7
Gorno Dupeni	33	30	0	0	0	0	0	0	3
Gorno Krushje	55	49	1	0	0	0	0	4	1
Grnchari	311	54	230	4	0	0	0	1	22
Dolna Bela Crkva	179	117	56	0	0	0	0	0	6
Dolno Dupeni	174	164	0	0	0	0	0	1	9
Dolno Perovo	111	103	3	0	0	0	0	0	5
Drmeni	361	350	0	6	0	0	0	0	5
Evla	51	50	0	0	0	0	0	0	1
Ezerani	137	137	0	0	0	0	0	0	0
Zlatari	72	69	0	0	0	0	0	0	3
Izbishta	128	121	0	0	0	0	1	0	6
Ilino	0	0	0	0	0	0	0	0	0
Jankovec	1106	1020	6	28	0	14	5	0	26
Kozjak	85	1	8	74	0	0	0	0	2
Konjsko	13	11	0	0	0	0	0	0	2
Krani	361	74	263	0	13	0	0	0	11
Kriveni	15	14	0	0	0	0	0	1	0
Kurbinovo	101	101	0	0	0	0	0	0	0
Lavci	118	13	6	98	0	0	0	0	1
Leva Reka	41	40	0	0	0	0	0	0	1
Leskoec	0	0	0	0	0	0	0	0	0
Ljubojno	141	131	0	1	0	1	0	0	7
Nakolec	212	78	115	0	7	0	0	0	8
Oteshevo	0	0	0	0	0	0	0	0	0
Petrino	0	0	0	0	0	0	0	0	0
Podmochani	261	254	2	0	0	0	2	0	3
Pokrvenik	70	69	1	0	0	0	0	0	0
Preljubje	7	5	0	0	0	0	0	0	2
Pretor	116	110	0	0	0	0	5	0	1
Rajca	51	51	0	0	0	0	0	0	0
Slivnica	170	167	0	0	0	0	1	0	2
Sopocko	152	111	31	0	0	0	0	0	10
Stenje	304	251	0	0	0	0	3	0	48
Stipona	0	0	0	0	0	0	0	0	0
Carev Dvor	470	388	3	58	0	0	1	0	19
Shtrbovo	137	129	0	0	0	0	0	0	6
Shurlenci	75	73	0	0	0	0	1	0	1
