= List of settlements on the Prespa Lakes shorelines =

This is a list of settlements located on the coastlines of the two Prespa Lakes: Great Prespa Lake (also known simply as Prespa Lake) and Small Prespa Lake. The Prespa Lakes are both freshwater lakes, located between the countries of North Macedonia, Greece and Albania. Settlements are automatically listed for Great Prespa Lake from Šurlenci, Republic of Macedonia, clockwise. For Small Prespa Lake, settlements are listed from Plati, Greece, clockwise. The table can be reorganised based on country, municipality name, population, and the language(s) spoken in the settlement. Major settlements (population of 1000 or greater) are highlighted in bold.

== Great Prespa Lake ==
Settlement	Country	Other names	Municipality	Population	Date, Source	Language(s)
Šurlenci	R. Macedonia	Шурленци	Resen Municipality	89	2002 census	Macedonian
Volkoderi	R. Macedonia	Волкодери	Resen Municipality	114	2002 census	Macedonian
Pokrvenik	R. Macedonia	Покрвеник	Resen Municipality	65	2002 census	Macedonian
Dolno Perovo	R. Macedonia	Перово	Resen Municipality	175	2002 census	Macedonian
Ezerani	R. Macedonia	Езерани	Resen Municipality	203	2002 census	Macedonian
Asamati	R. Macedonia	Asamat, Асамати	Resen Municipality	175	2002 census	Albanian, Macedonian, Turkish
Pretor	R. Macedonia	Претор	Resen Municipality	142	2002 census	Macedonian
Slivnica	R. Macedonia	Сливница	Resen Municipality	188	2002 census	Macedonian
Krani	R. Macedonia	Крани, Kranja	Resen Municipality	416	2002 census	Albanian, Macedonian
Štrbovo	R. Macedonia	Штрбово	Resen Municipality	184	2002 census	Macedonian
Nakolec	R. Macedonia	Nakoleci, Наколец	Resen Municipality	184	2002 census	Albanian, Macedonian
Dolno Dupeni	R. Macedonia	Долно Дупени	Resen Municipality	235	2002 census	Macedonian
Agios Germanos	Greece	Герман, Άγιος Γερμανός	Prespes Municipality	231	2001 census	Macedonian, Aromanian, Pontic Greek
Lemos	Greece		Prespes Municipality	250		Macedonian, Greek
Psarades	Greece	Ψαράδες, Нивици	Prespes Municipality	83	2011 census	Macedonian, Greek
Zrnovsko	Albania	Зрновско, Zaroshkë, Zaroshka	Pustec Municipality	348	2000 census	Macedonian
**Pustec**	Albania	Пустец, Pustets, Liqenas	Pustec Municipality	**1,120**	2000 census	Macedonian
Shulin	Albania	Шулин, Diellas	Pustec Municipality	502	2000 census	Macedonian
Glloboçeni	Albania	Глобочени, Gollomboç	Pustec Municipality	294	2000 census	Macedonian
Dolna Gorica	Albania	Долна Горица, Goricë e Vogël	Pustec Municipality	364	2000 census	Macedonian
Tuminec	Albania	Туминец, Bezmisht, Kallamas	Pustec Municipality	950	2007 estimate	Macedonian
Konjsko	R. Macedonia	Коњско	Resen Municipality	3	2002 census	Macedonian
Stenje	R. Macedonia	Стење	Resen Municipality	438	2002 census	Macedonian
Oteševo	R. Macedonia	Отешево	Resen Municipality	0	2002 census	
