= Štrbovo =

Štrbovo Штрбово
- Village
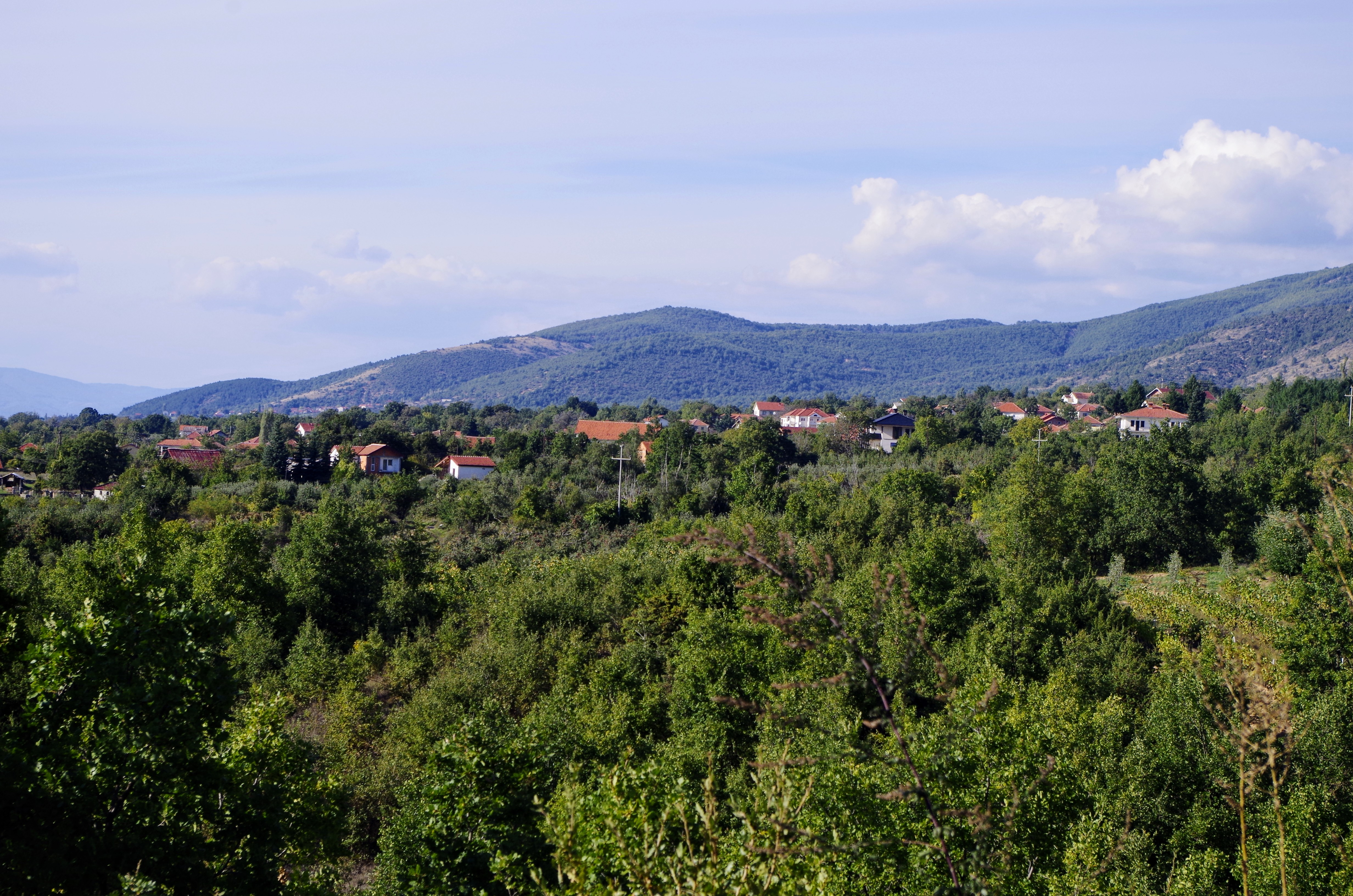

- Location within North Macedonia
- Coordinates: 40°55′33″N 21°06′09″E
- Country: North Macedonia
- Region: Pelagonia
- Municipality: Resen

Population (2002)
  - Total: 184
- Time zone: UTC+1 (CET)
  - Summer (DST): UTC+2 (CEST)
- Area code: +389
- Car plates: RE

Štrbovo (Macedonian: Штрбово) is a village in the Resen Municipality of North Macedonia. Its current population is 184. Štrbovo is divided into Gorno (Upper) Štrbovo and Dolno (Lower) Štrbovo.

It is located on the eastern coast of Lake Prespa and is only 2 miles from the border with Aegean Macedonia.

The earliest known records that mention Štrbovo date back to 1538.

The village was formed in the area of Štrbovo called "Šhešuri." Later the village moved west to the location called "Rekite" (The Rivers)and soon after it relocated to another location called "Kukista."

The villagers now live in "Dolno Selo" (Lower Village) which consists of 62 houses.

"Gorno Selo" (Upper Village) is now all farm land with a few historic abandoned houses still standing.

Štrbovo has a natural river that flows through "Gorno Selo" and empties into the Krani River in the neighboring village of Krani.

A book about the village "Štrbovo Gordoct Naša" (Štrbovo, Our Pride) was written by Jonče Filipovski in the year 1998.

== Demographics ==
Štrbovo has historically had a mostly ethnic Macedonian population.

Ethnic group	census 1961		census 1971		census 1981		census 1991		census 1994		census 2002	
Ethnic group	Number	%	Number	%	Number	%	Number	%	Number	%	Number	%
Macedonians	367	99.7	290	100.0	284	98.3	329	99.7	194	99.5	184	100.0
others	1	0.3	0	0.0	5	1.7	1	0.3	1	0.5	0	0.0
Total	368		290		289		330		195		184	

== Gallery ==
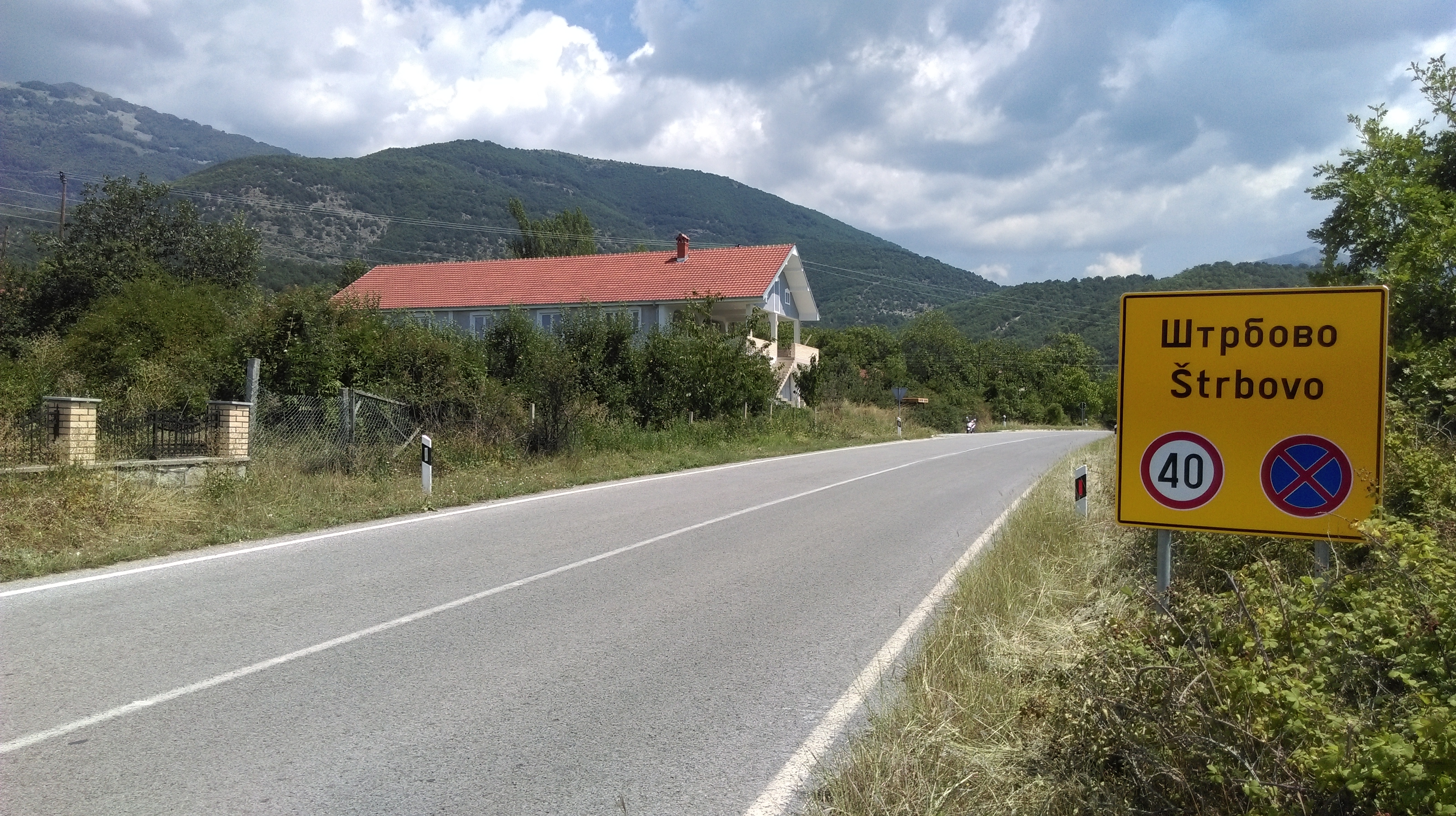
Sign hailing entrance on main road to Štrbovo

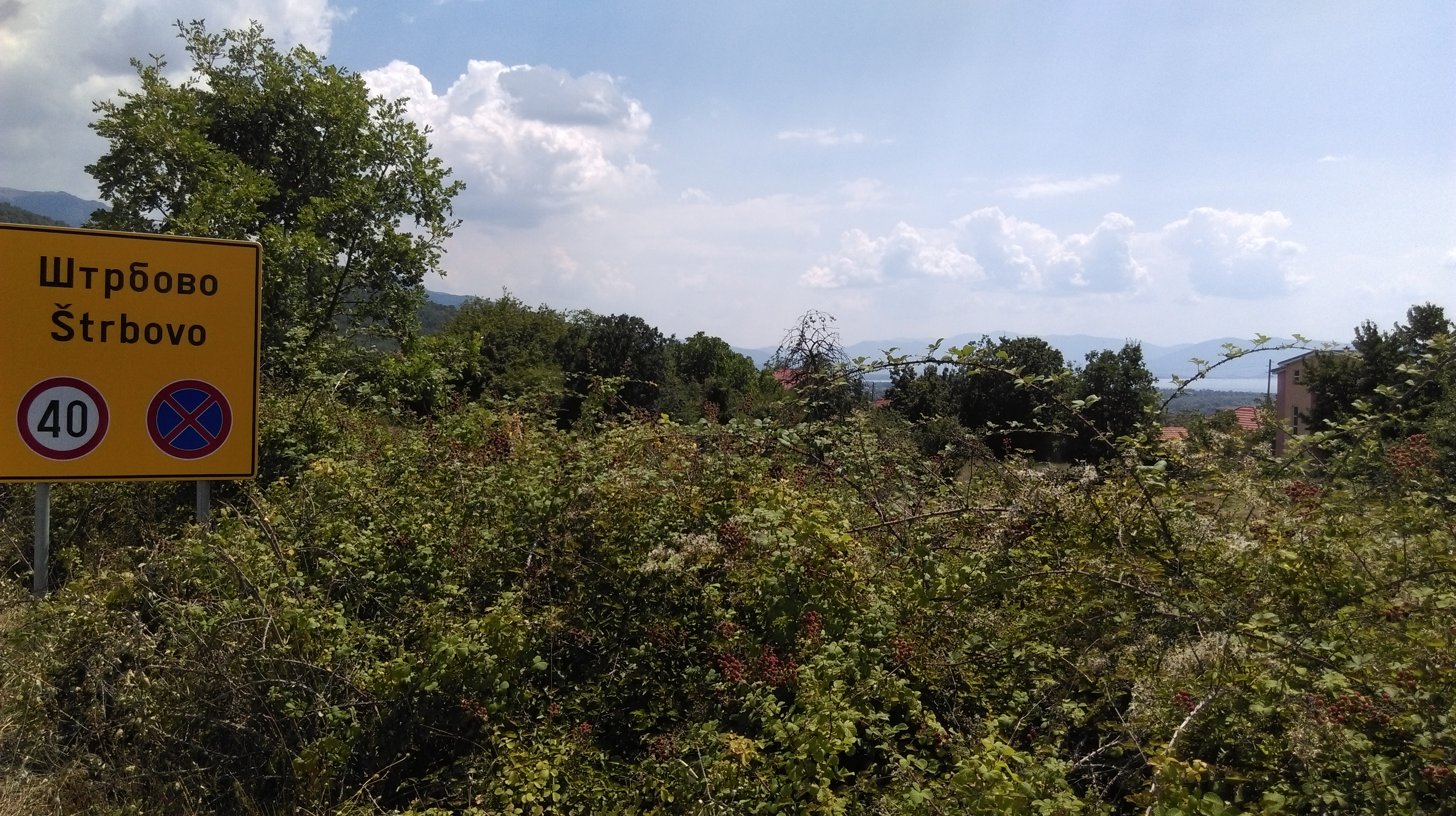
Entrance near Štrbovo

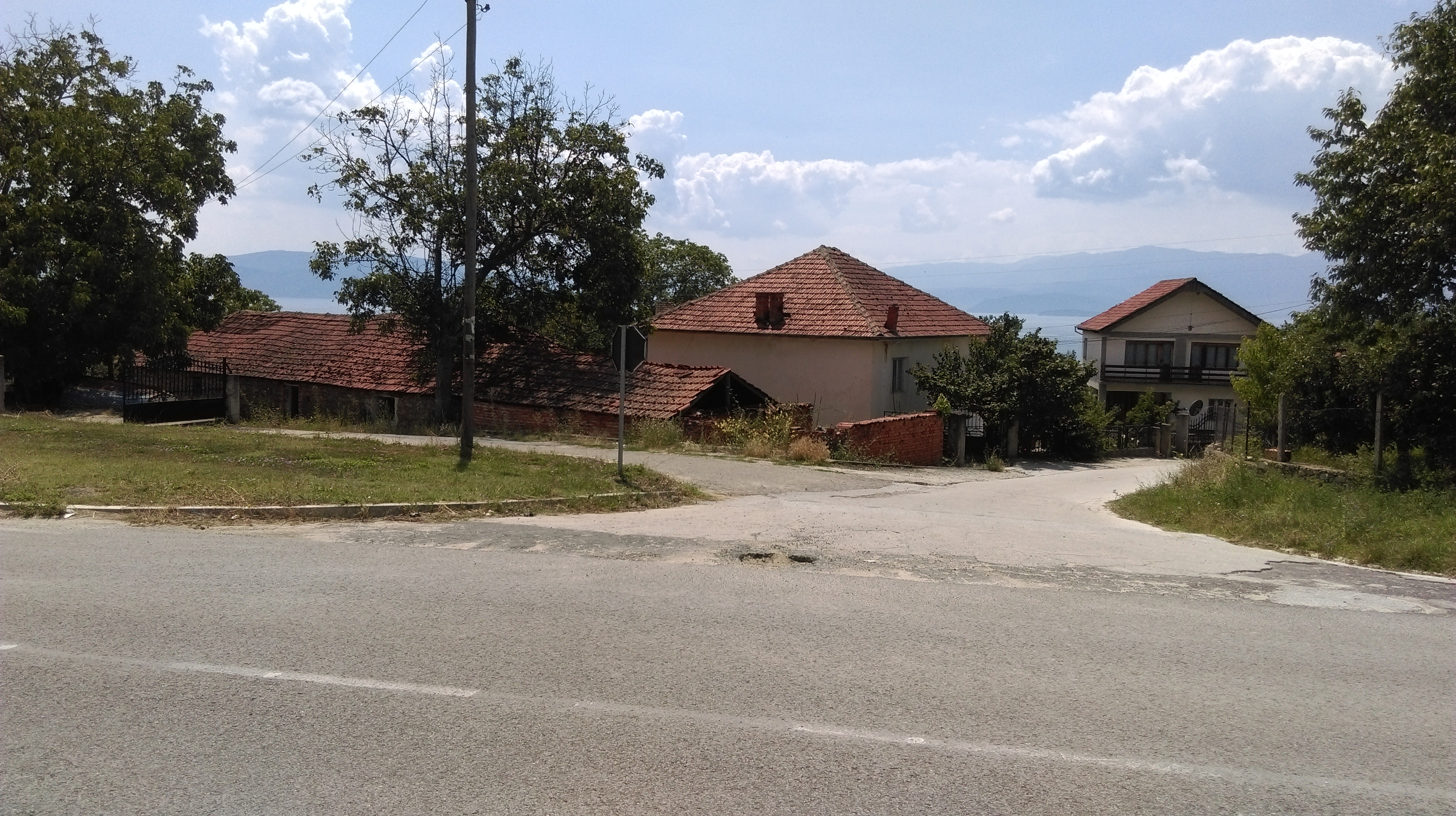
Architecture of Štrbovo

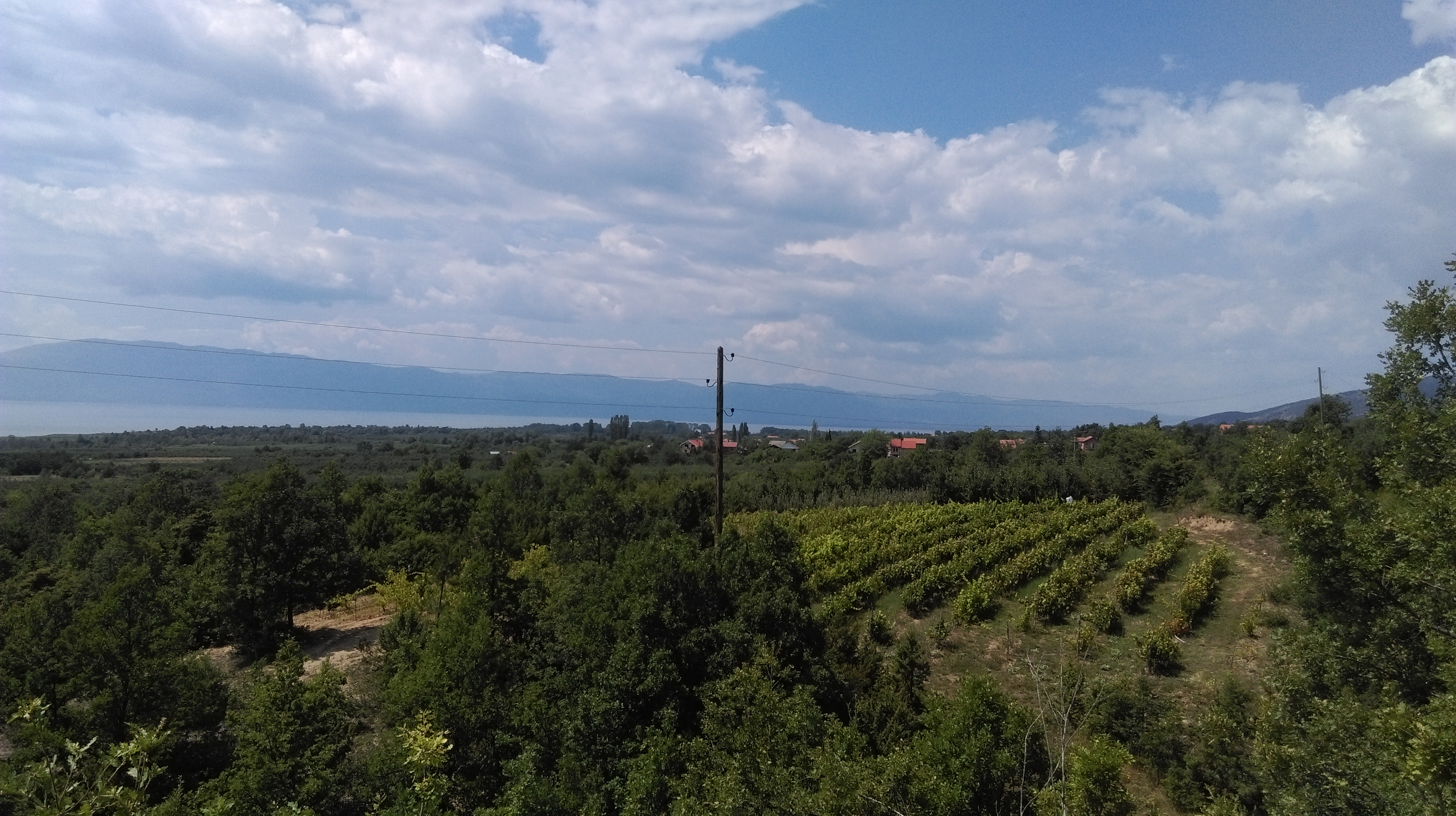
Fields of Štrbovo with village and Lake Prespa nearby in background

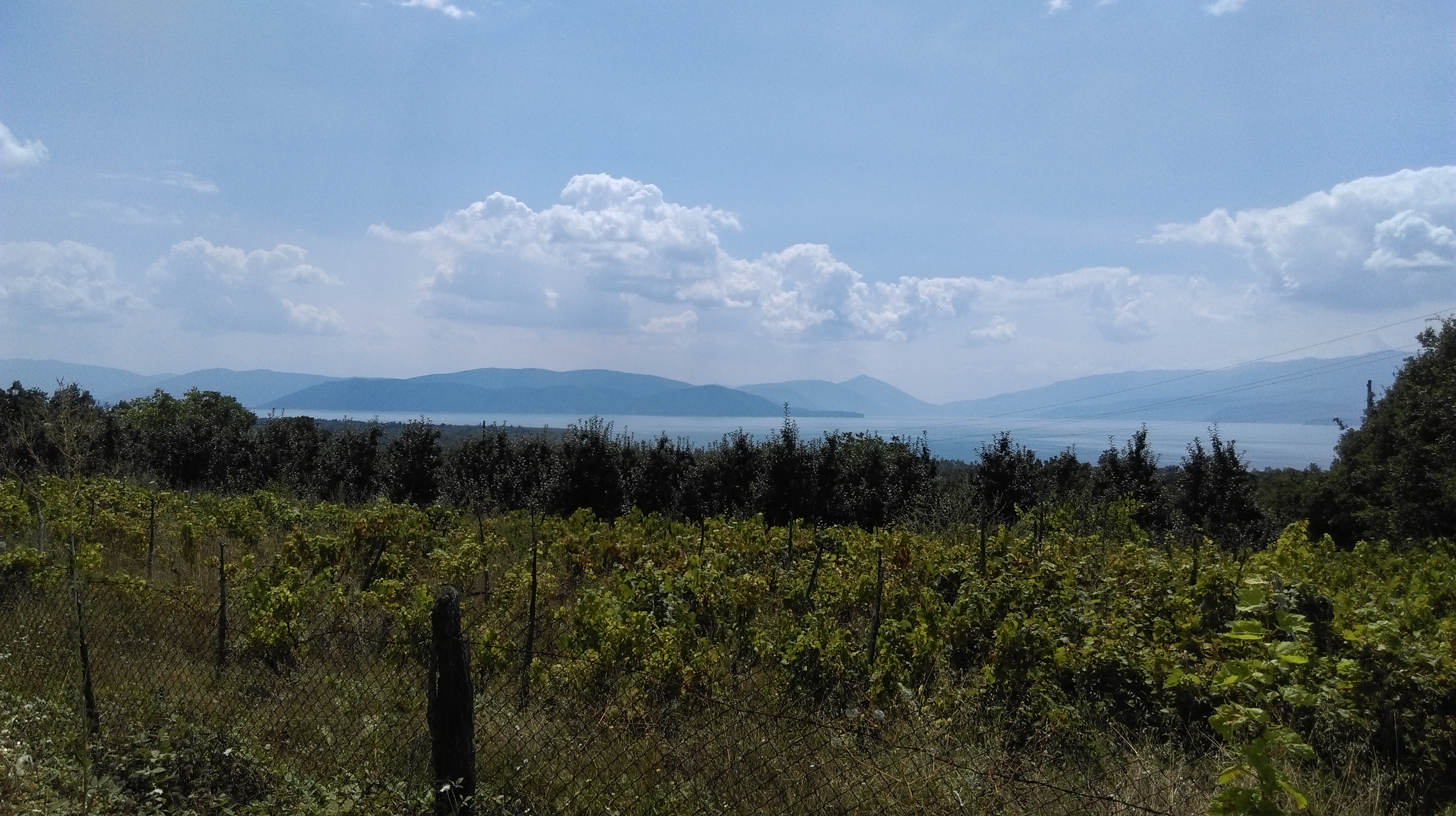
Fields of Štrbovo and Lake Prespa in background

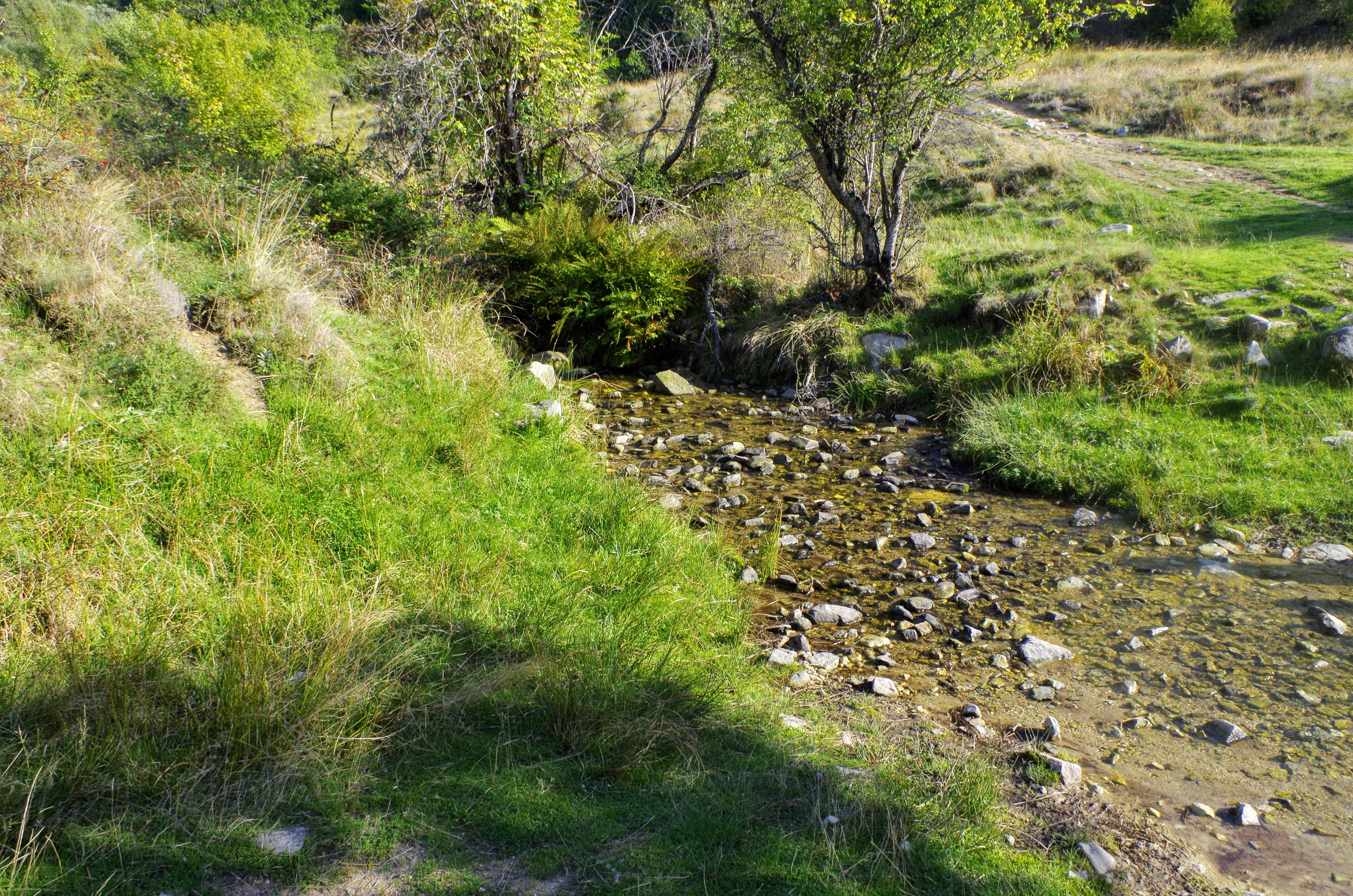
Štrbovo River

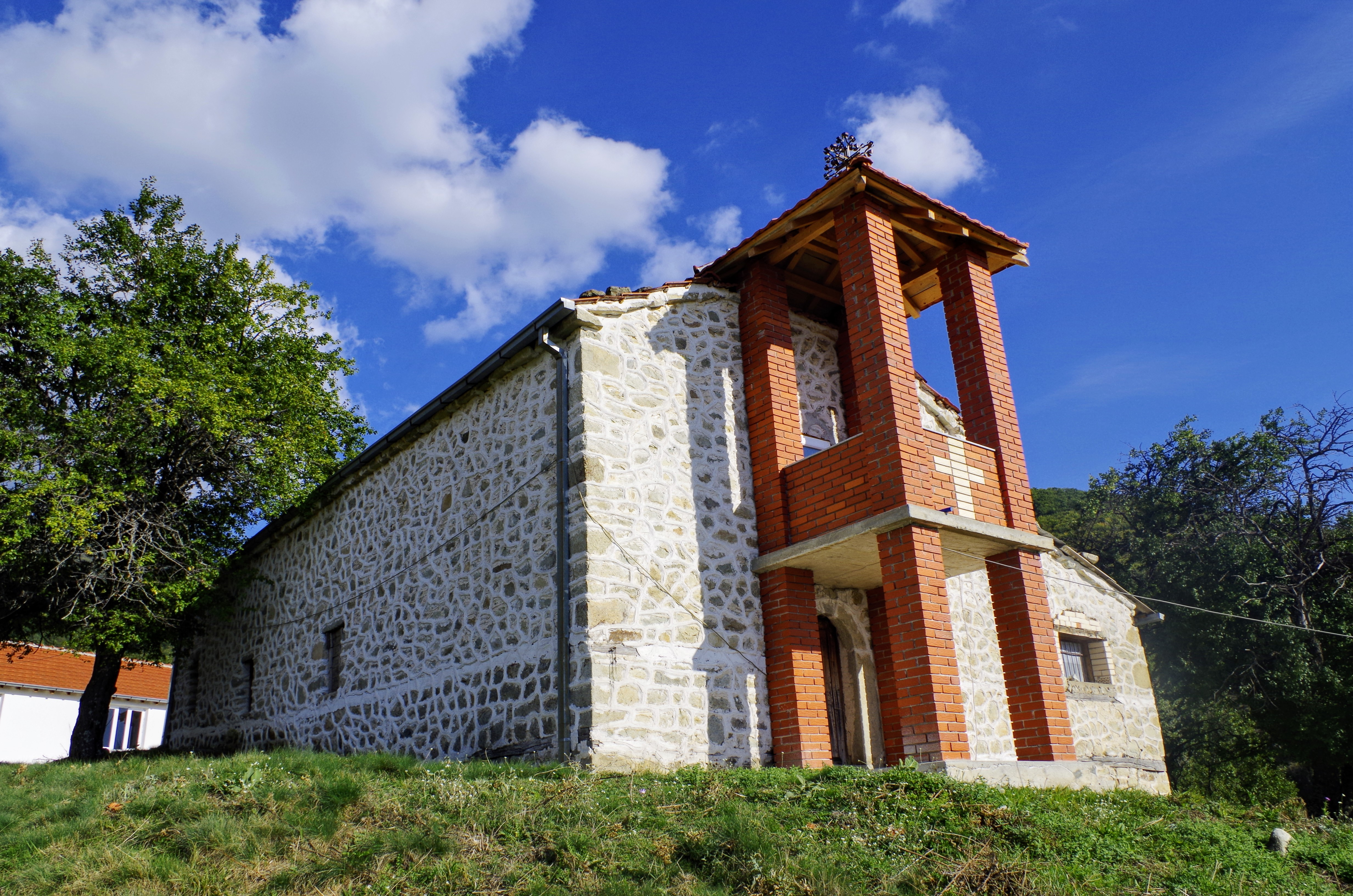
St. Athanasius Church

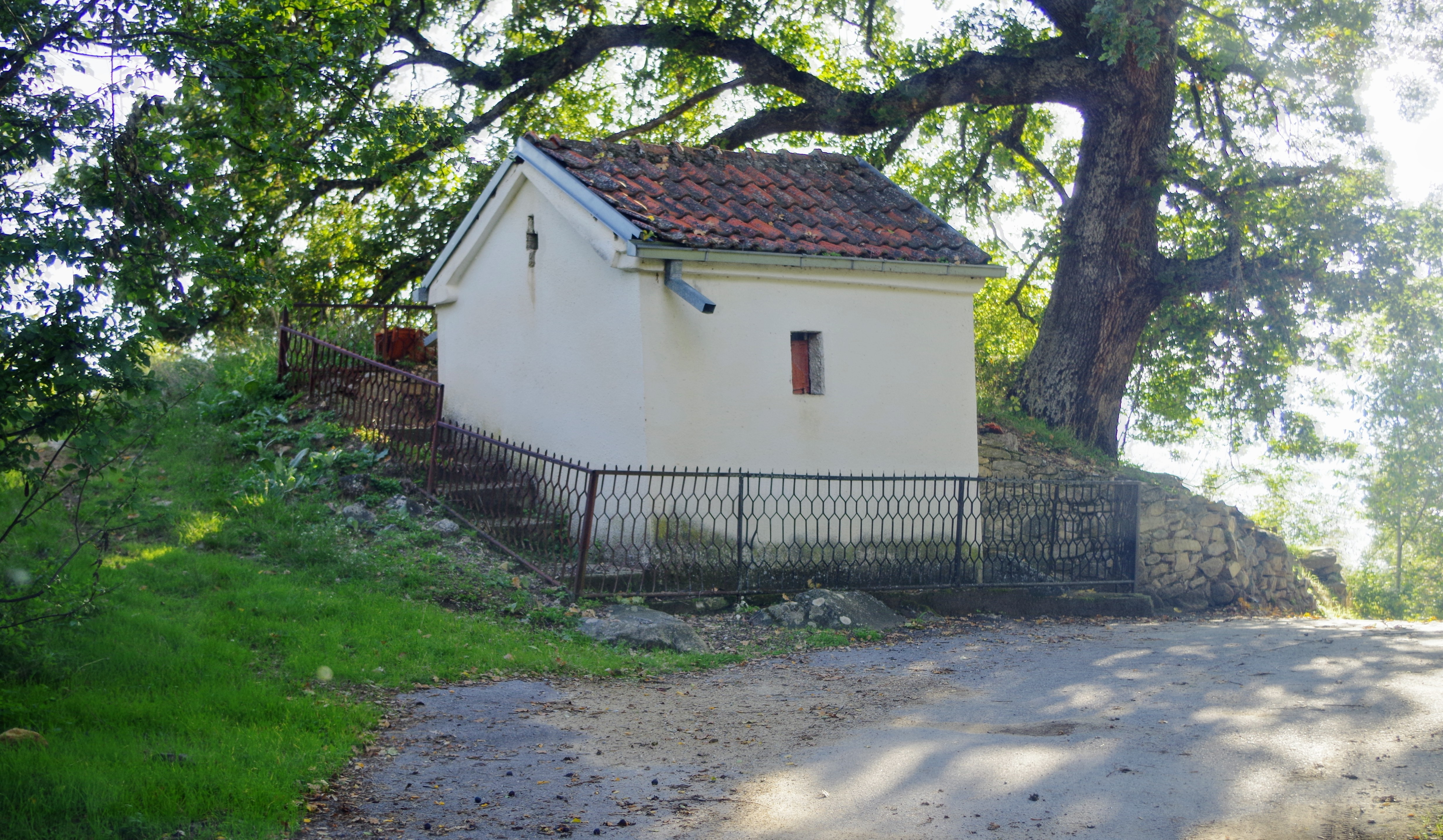
Church of the Theotokos

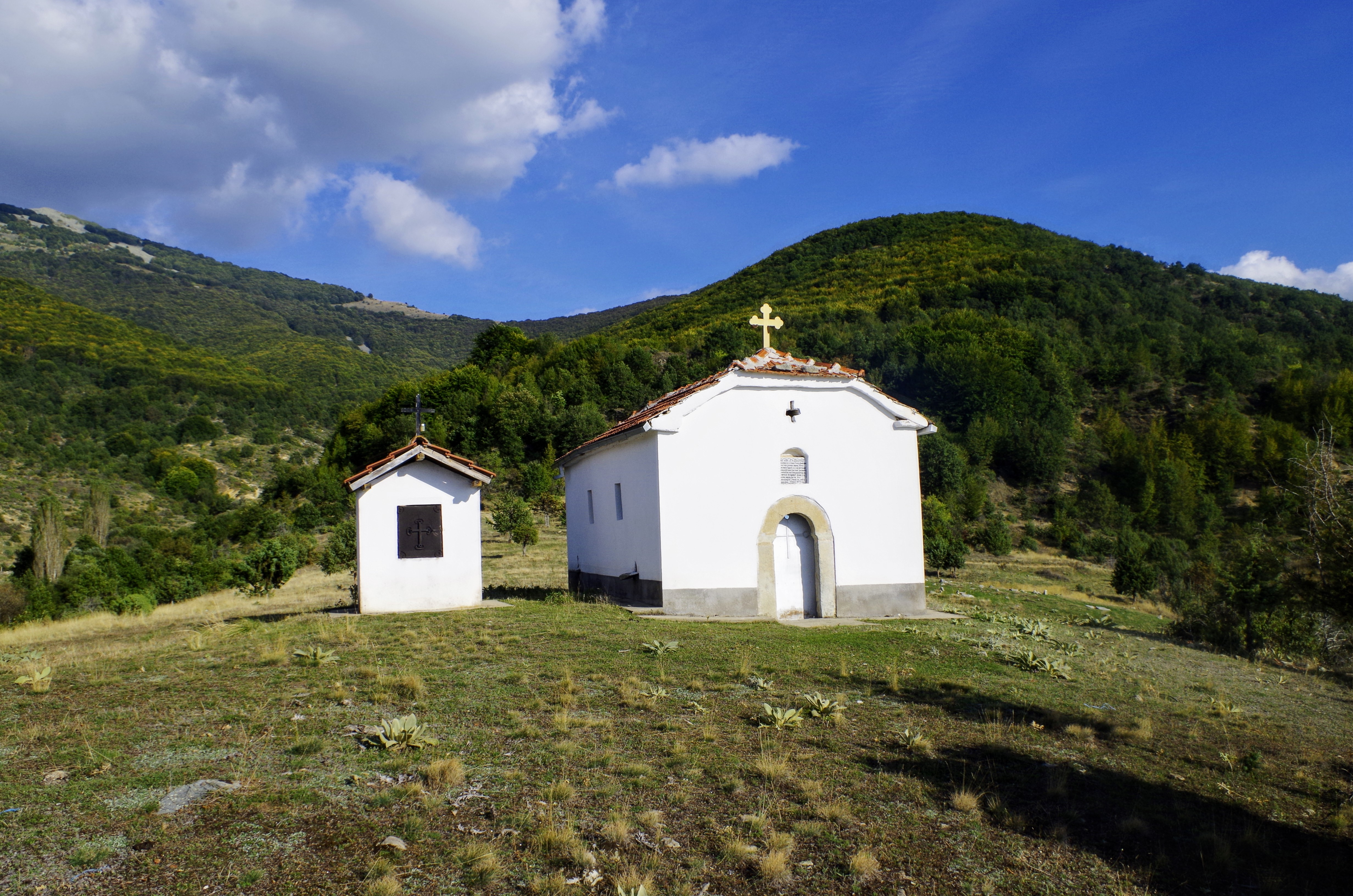
St. Demetrius Church

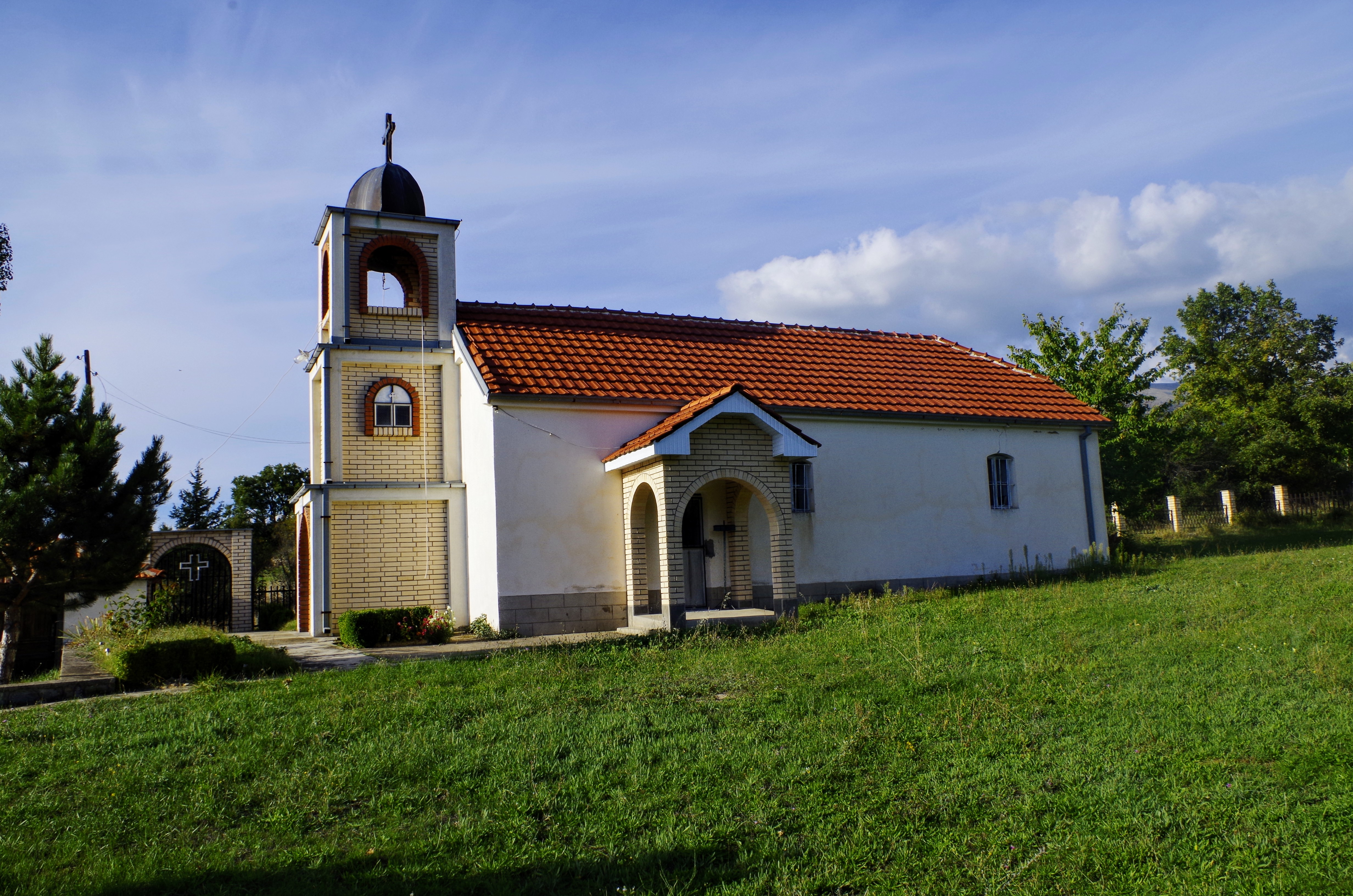
St. Nicholas Church

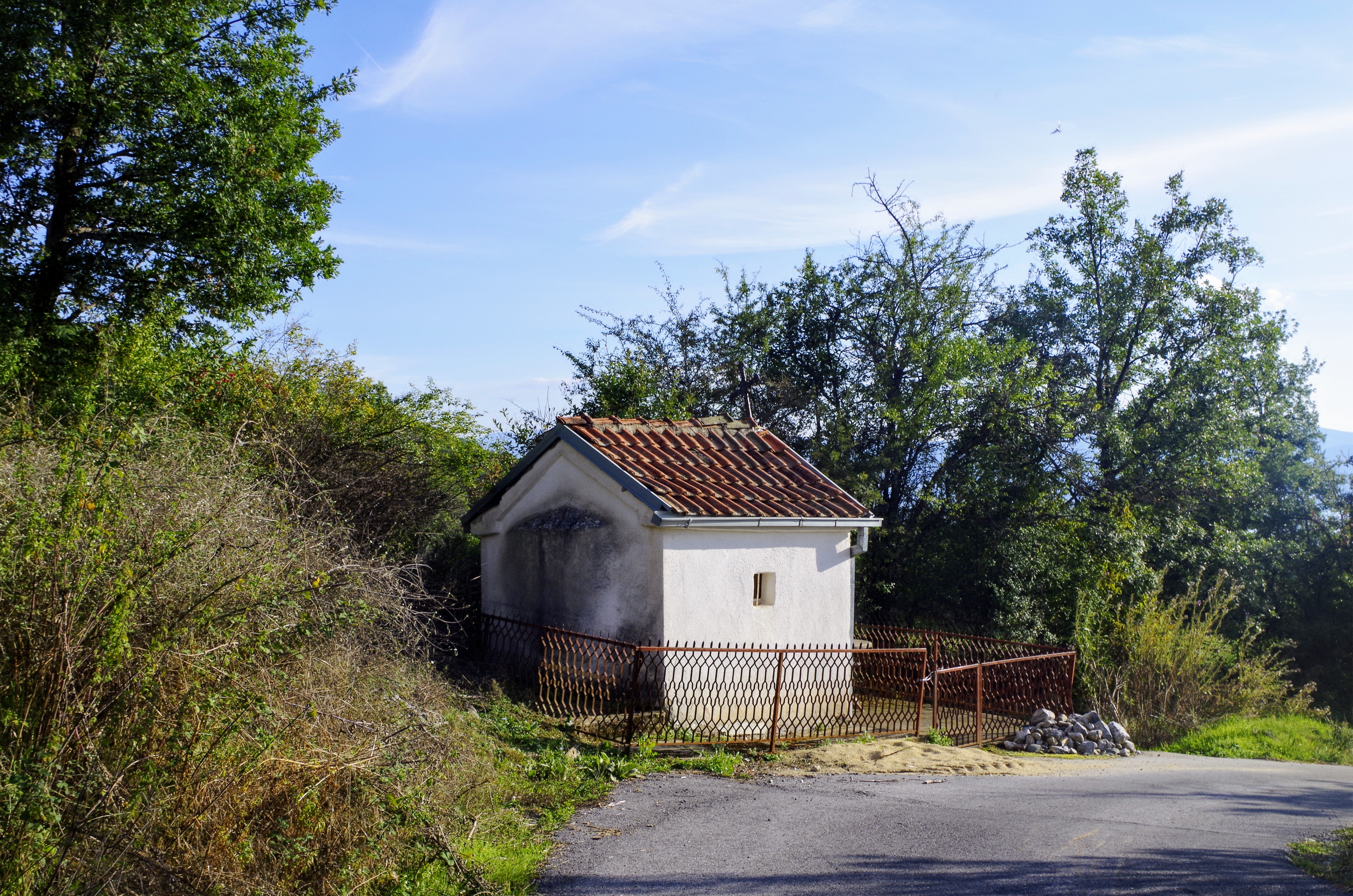
St. Petka Church
