= Pande Eftimov =

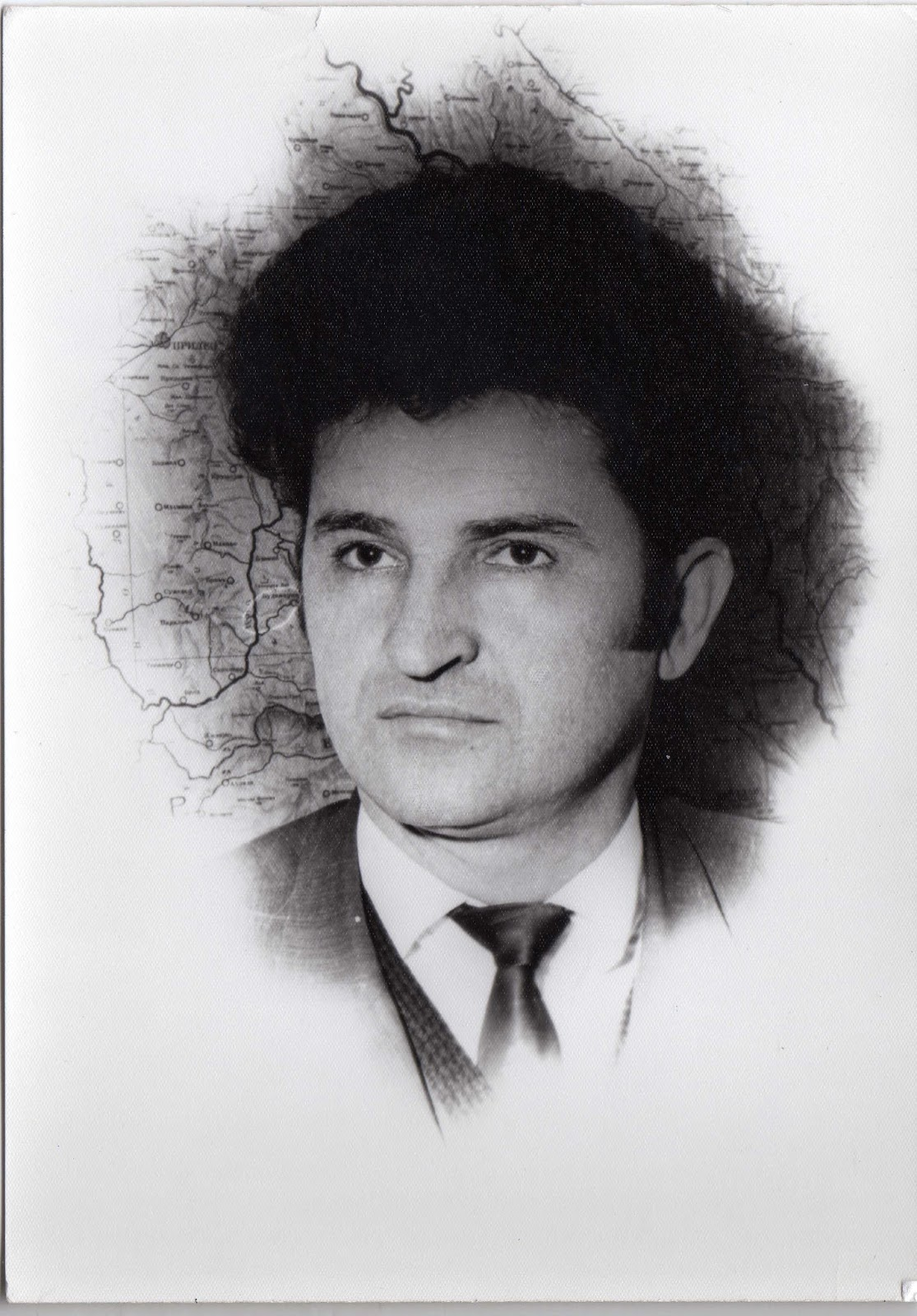

Pande Sotirov Eftimov (March 15, 1932-August 13, 2017) was a Bulgarian journalist, poet and publicist from North Macedonia. Though, he is considered an ethnic Macedonian in today North Macedonia.

== History ==
=== Childhood and education ===
Pande Eftimov was born in 1932 in the Prespa village of Pretor in the Kingdom of Yugoslavia, but today in present-day North Macedonia. He was the grandson of the revolutionary from the IMRO Pande Sudzhov, killed by the Yugoslav authorities in 1927. In 1943, as a child, Eftimov welcomed a Bulgarian delegation in Pretor, when Bulgarians entered this area, after the capitulation of Italy. After the war Eftimov graduated from the Faculty of Philology at the University of Skopje, then in Communist Yugoslavia.

=== Journalism, prison, and death ===
In 1956 he informed the Bulgarians about the finding of an important artifact called Bitola inscription. Eftimov photographed the stone slab and secretly carried the tape with the photos at the Bulgarian embassy in Belgrade. At that time he was appointed a teacher in the village of Lera, Bitola region. There he found part of the archives of the local Bulgarian school, which the Yugoslav authorities at the time had failed to burn. Later, the documents were handed over to Kosta Tsarnushanov, another publicist from Vardar Macedonia, living in Sofia. During his early journalistic years and later in life, Eftimov stated his belief that Bulgarians in Macedonia and the country itself has been losing its identity ever since the actions of the Yugoslavian government from the 1930's onward against Bulgarian peoples and due to the nation's geographical isolation from Bulgaria.

He participated in different illegal groups seeking Macedonia's independence, as it was envisioned by the IMRO. For that he spent 7 years in prison: between 1957 and 1961, as well as from 1971 to 1974. Eftimov was arrested also many other times by the Yugoslavs. Meanwhile, he worked as journalist for the Skopje newspaper "Narodna Prosveta". After 1986 he participated in the process of forming the new VMRO-DPMNE party. In 2001 he published two books of poetry, printed in Bulgarian. In 2007 he received officially Bulgarian citizenship. He died on August 13, 2017, in Sofia. On June 25, 2018, he was posthumously awarded with the Order of Stara Planina for his exceptionally great merits in preserving the Bulgarian national heritage in Republic of Macedonia.

== See also ==
- Law for the Protection of Macedonian National Honour
- Bitola Inscription
