= Dolno Perovo =

Dolno Perovo Долна Перово
- Village
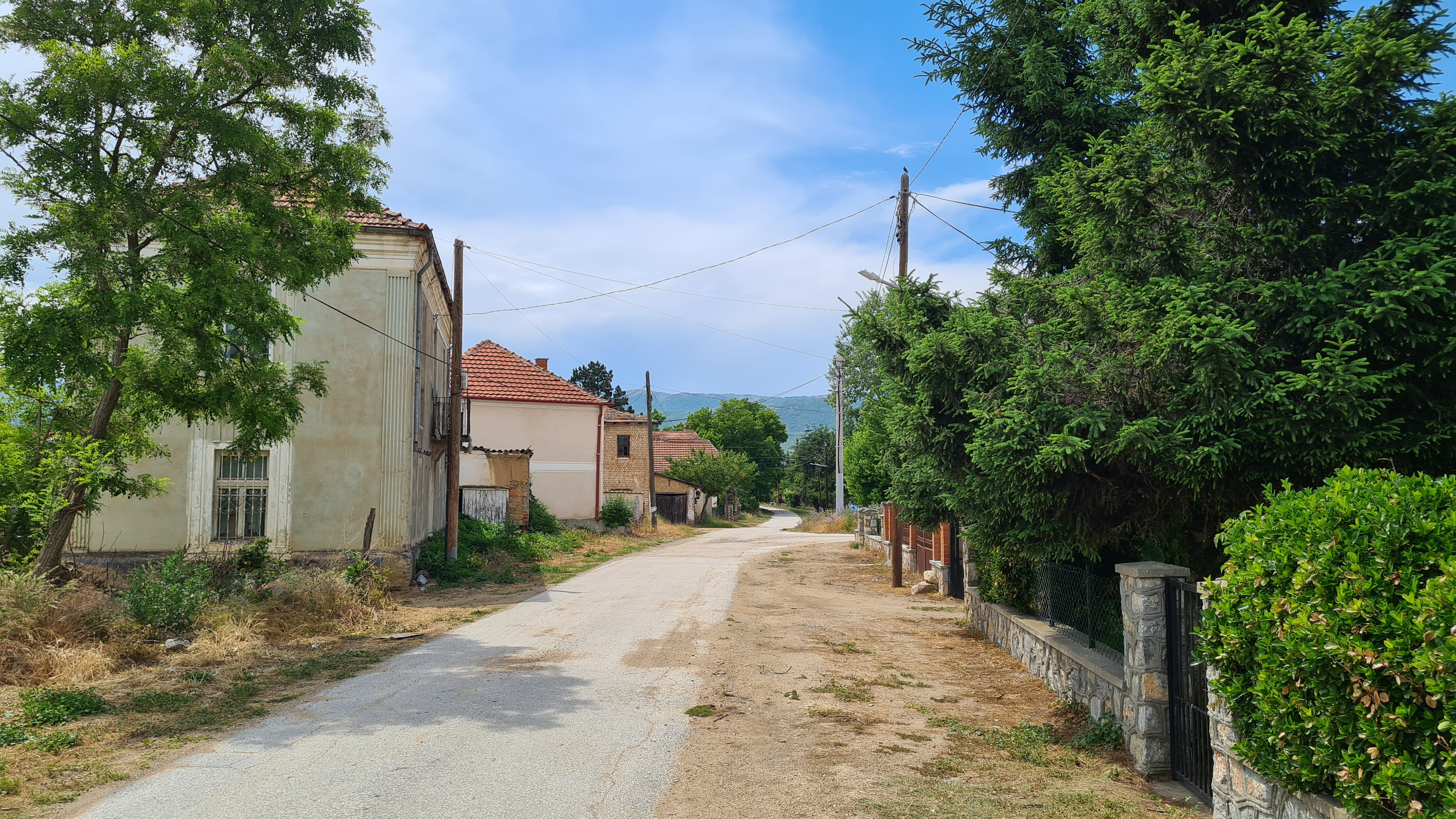
- Houses in the village Dolno Perovo

- Location within North Macedonia
- Coordinates: 41°00′51″N 20°59′21″E
- Country: North Macedonia
- Region: Pelagonia
- Municipality: Resen

Population (2002)
  - Total: 175
- Time zone: UTC+1 (CET)
  - Summer (DST): UTC+2 (CEST)
- Area code: +389
- Car plates: RE

Dolno Perovo (Macedonian: Долно Перово), or simply Perovo, is a village north of Lake Prespa in the Resen Municipality of North Macedonia. The village is located almost 9 kilometres (5.6 mi) from the municipal centre of Resen.

== Demographics ==
Perovo's population has generally declined over the past several decades.

Ethnic group	census 1961		census 1971		census 1981		census 1991		census 1994		census 2002	
Ethnic group	Number	%	Number	%	Number	%	Number	%	Number	%	Number	%
Macedonians	458	100	351	100	323	97.6	209	100	213	100	175	100
others	0	0.0	0	0.0	8	2.4	0	0.0	0	0.0	0	0.0
Total	428		351		331		209		213		175	
