= Volkoderi =

Volkoderi Волкодери
- Village
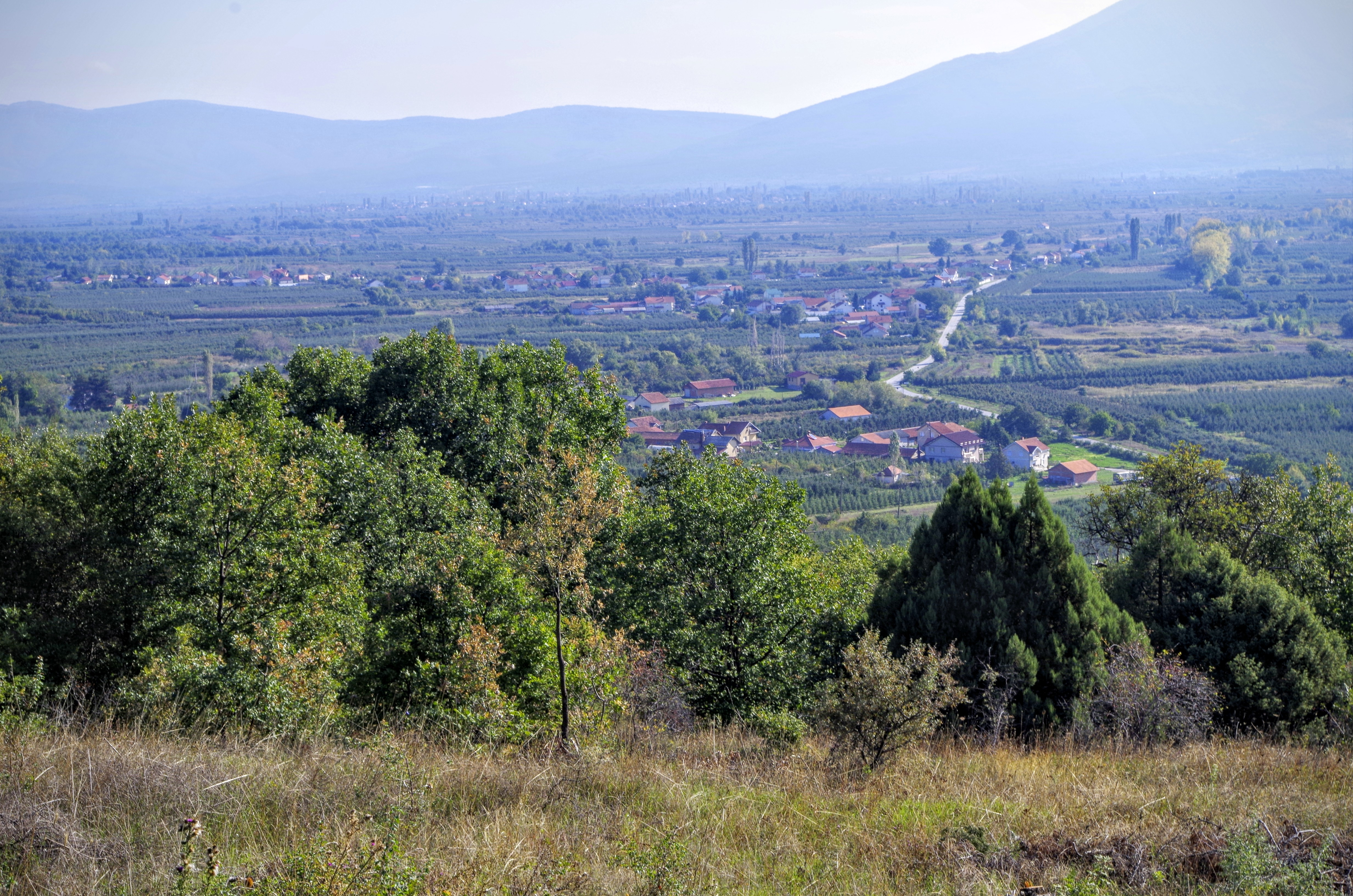
- Panoramic view of the village Volkoderi (second on the image)

- Location within North Macedonia
- Coordinates: 41°01′14″N 20°56′39″E
- Country: North Macedonia
- Region: Pelagonia
- Municipality: Resen

Population (2002)
  - Total: 114
- Time zone: UTC+1 (CET)
  - Summer (DST): UTC+2 (CEST)
- Area code: +389
- Car plates: RE

Volkoderi (Macedonian: Волкодери) is a village in the Resen Municipality of North Macedonia, northwest of Lake Prespa and near Galičica Mountain. It is located over 9 kilometres (5.6 mi) west of the municipal centre of Resen.

== History ==
Volkoderi was recorded as having 11 households and 32 male inhabitants in 1873.

The village suffered during the Ilinden Uprising. Ten of the village's homes were burnt down and herds of cattle were taken by the Ottoman Turks.

== Demographics ==
Volkoderi has a population of 114 people and is one of only four villages in Resen Municipality that saw a population increase from the 1994 census to the one in 2002.

Ethnic group	census 1961		census 1971		census 1981		census 1991		census 1994		census 2002	
Ethnic group	Number	%	Number	%	Number	%	Number	%	Number	%	Number	%
Macedonians	64	100.0	70	100.0	51	100.0	102	99.0	102	100.0	114	100.0
others	0	0.0	0	0.0	0	0.0	1	1.0	0	0.0	0	0.0
Total	64		70		51		103		102		114	
