= Zërnovskë =

Zërnovskë Zrnovsko Zaroshkë Зрновско
- Village
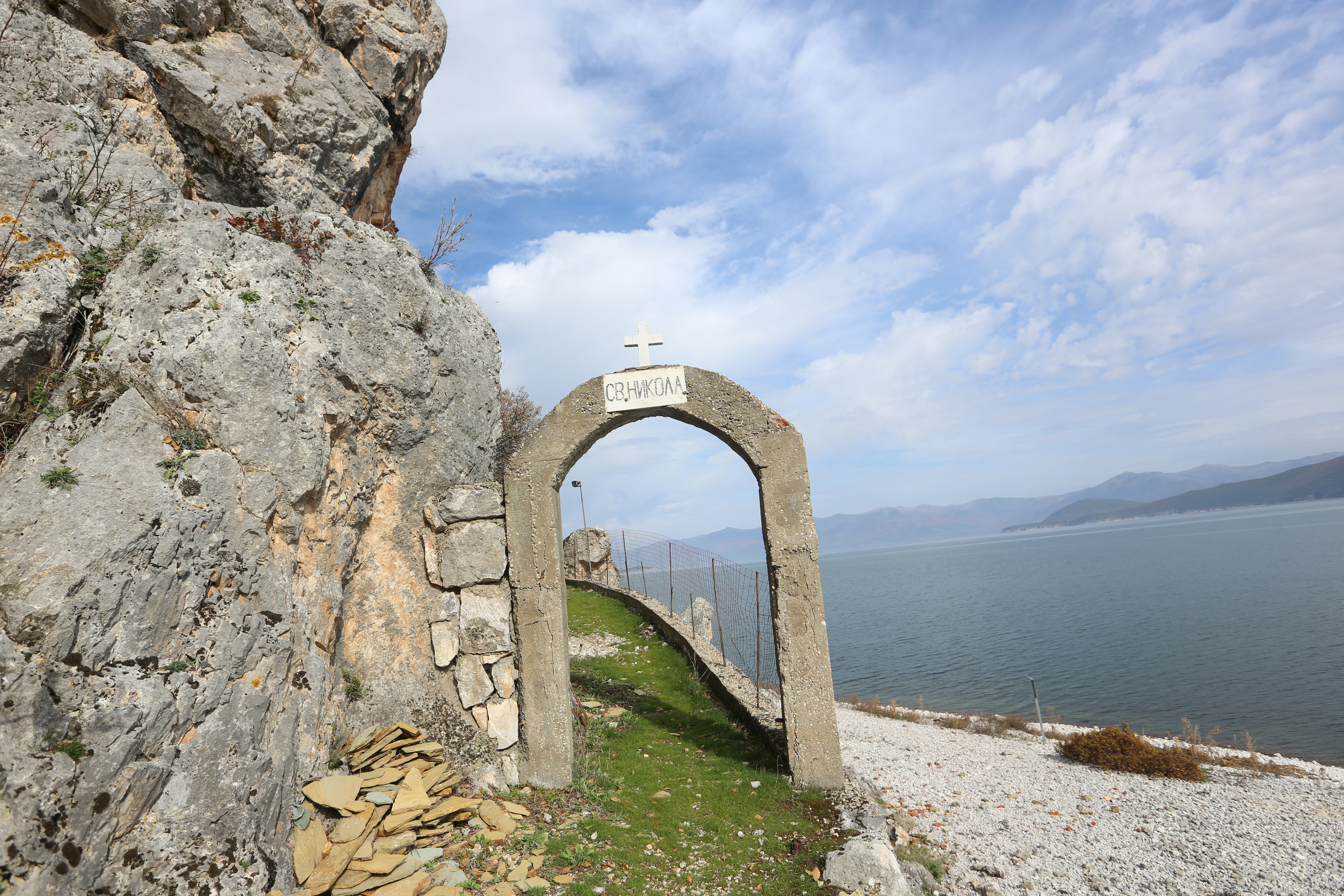

- Location within Albania
- Coordinates: 40°45′51″N 20°54′29″E
- Country: Albania
- County: Korçë
- Municipality: Pustec
- Administrative unit: Pustec
- Time zone: UTC+1 (CET)
  - Summer (DST): UTC+2 (CEST)

Zërnosko (Albanian: Zërnosko, formerly Zaroshkë; Macedonian: Зрновско, Bulgarian: Зърновско) is a village in the Pustec Municipality which is officially recognised as a Macedonian minority zone located in the Korçë County in Albania. It is located at the southeastern end of Lake Prespa, south of the village of Pustec. The village is composed of ethnic Macedonians, which form part of the larger Macedonian minority in Albania. According to sources, including research by a scientist from Albania, the local inhabitants are Macedonians.

== History ==
The "La Macédoine et sa Population Chrétienne" survey by Dimitar Mishev (D. Brankov) concluded that village had 120 Bulgarian Exarchists residents in 1905. In 1911, it was found to contain sixteen Bulgarian houses and 109 inhabitants.

In 1939, on behalf of 20 Bulgarian houses in Zarnovsko (Зърновско) Miag Sekula signed a request by the local Bulgarians to the Bulgarian tsaritsa Giovanna requesting her intervention for the protection of the Bulgarian people in Albania - at that time an Italian protectorate.

In 2013, the village's name, which had been changed to Zaroshkë during communist Albania, was reverted to Zrnovsko.
