= Šurlenci =

Šurlenci Шурленци
- Village
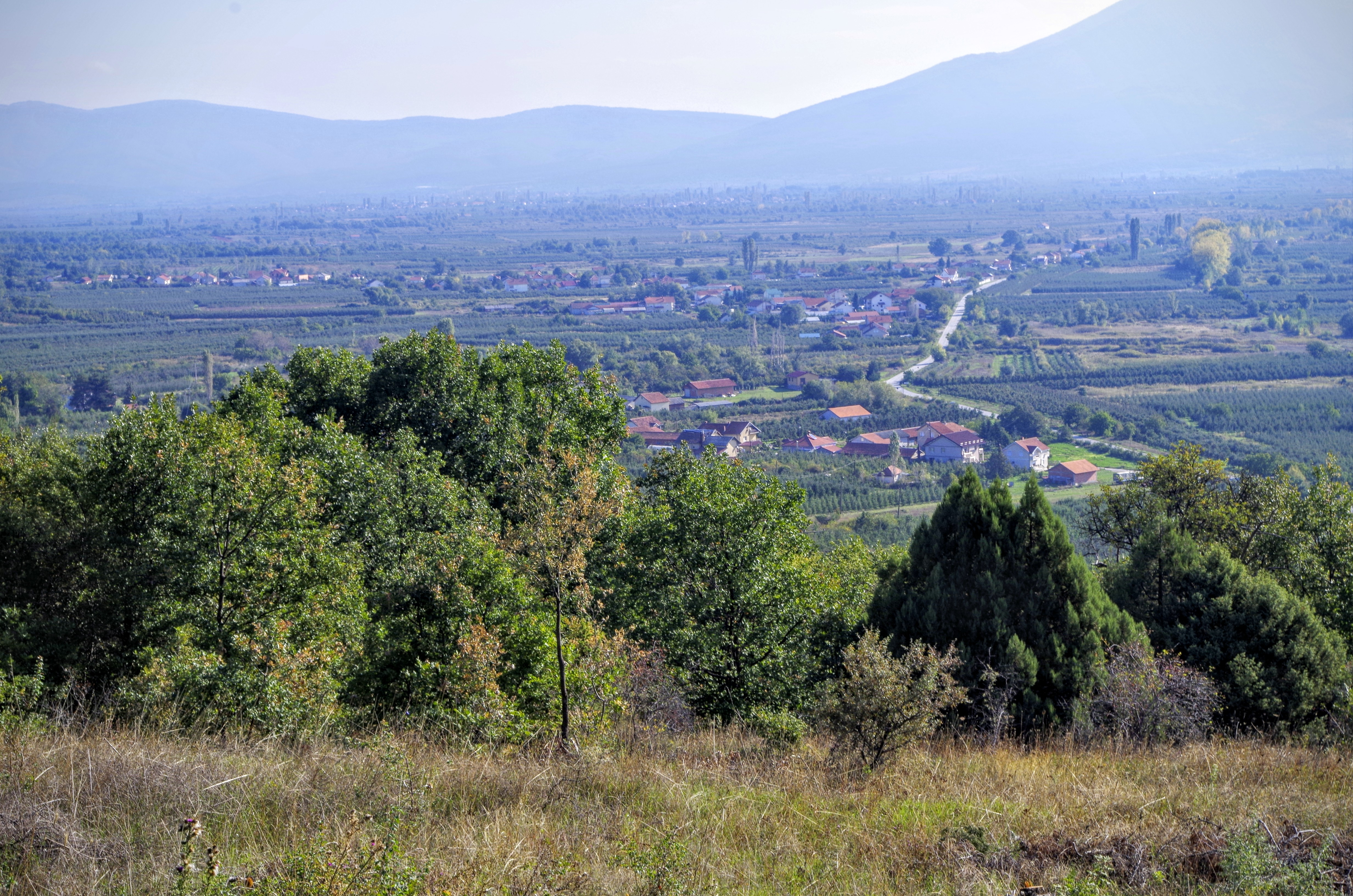
- Panoramic view of the village

- Location within North Macedonia
- Coordinates: 41°00′43″N 20°56′44″E
- Country: North Macedonia
- Region: Pelagonia
- Municipality: Resen

Population (2002)
  - Total: 89
- Time zone: UTC+1 (CET)
  - Summer (DST): UTC+2 (CEST)
- Area code: +389
- Car plates: RE

Šurlenci (Macedonian: Шурленци) is a village on the northeastern shore of Lake Prespa in the Resen Municipality of North Macedonia, east of Galičica. It is located roughly 10 kilometres (6.2 mi) from the municipal centre of Resen.

== Demographics ==
Šurlenci has a population of 89 people, as of the 2002 census, and has historically had a smaller population than most villages in the municipality.

| Ethnic group | census 1961 | | census 1971 | | census 1981 | | census 1991 | | census 1994 | | census 2002 | |
| Ethnic group | Number | % | Number | % | Number | % | Number | % | Number | % | Number | % |
|---|---|---|---|---|---|---|---|---|---|---|---|---|
| Macedonians | 127 | 100.0 | 109 | 98.2 | 103 | 98.1 | 110 | 99.1 | 99 | 99.0 | 88 | 98.9 |
| others | 0 | 0.0 | 2 | 1.8 | 2 | 1.9 | 1 | 0.9 | 1 | 1.0 | 1 | 1.1 |
| Total | 127 | | 111 | | 105 | | 111 | | 100 | | 89 | |
