= Pretor, Resen =

Pretor Претор
- Village
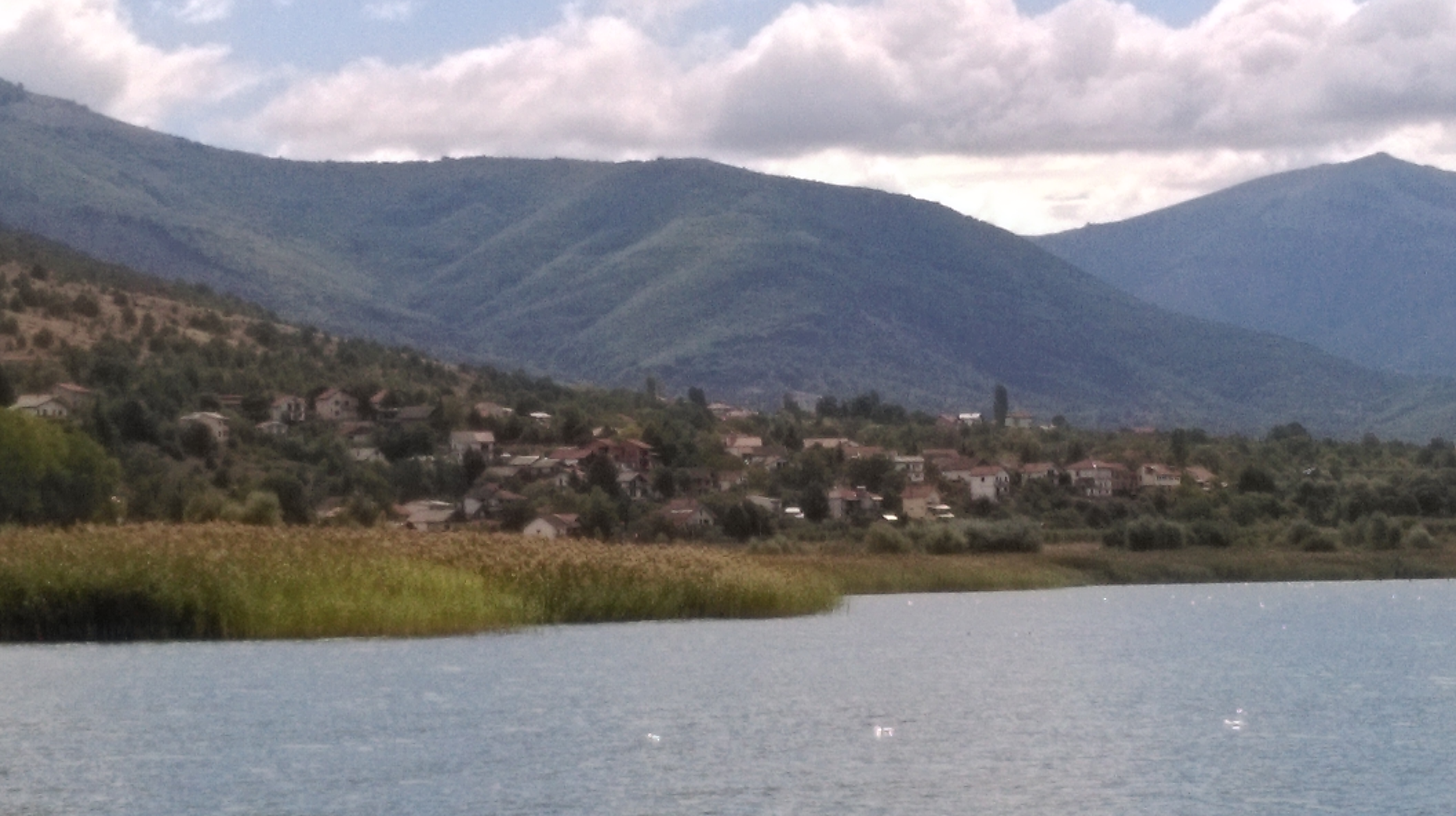
- Pretor

- Location within North Macedonia
- Coordinates: 40°58′46″N 21°03′42″E
- Country: North Macedonia
- Region: Pelagonia
- Municipality: Resen

Population (2002)
  - Total: 142
- Time zone: UTC+1 (CET)
  - Summer (DST): UTC+2 (CEST)
- Area code: +389
- Car plates: RE

Pretor (Macedonian: Претор) is a village in the Resen Municipality of North Macedonia, on the northeastern shore of Lake Prespa. It is over 13 kilometres (8.1 mi) south of the municipal centre of Resen.

== History ==
Pretor's oldest church, St Sava, is dated from the 14th century.

== Demographics ==
According to the statistics of Bulgarian ethnographer Vasil Kanchov from 1900 the settlement is recorded as "Pretorče" and as having 138 inhabitants, all Bulgarian Exarchists. Pretor has 142 inhabitants as of the most recent census of 2002. The majority ethnic group in the village has been the Macedonians.

Ethnic group	census 1961		census 1971		census 1981		census 1991		census 1994		census 2002	
Ethnic group	Number	%	Number	%	Number	%	Number	%	Number	%	Number	%
Macedonians	218	99.1	234	100	185	97.4	170	97.4	149	97.3	138	97.1
others	2	0.9	0	0.0	5	2.6	4	2.6	4	2.7	4	2.9
Total	220		234		190		174		153		142	

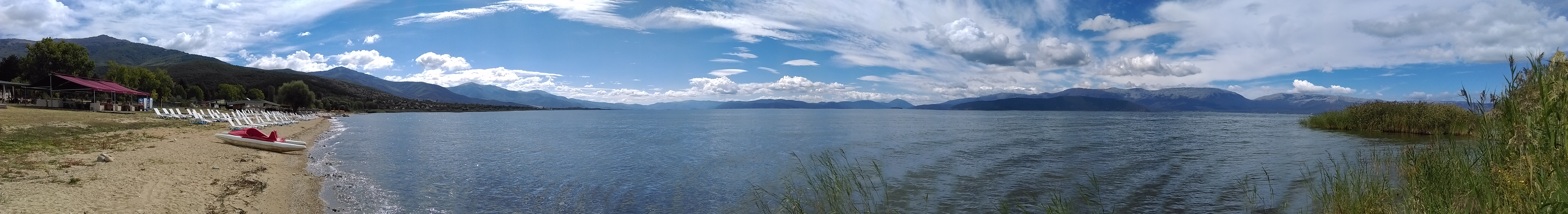
Panorama of Pretor beach with the village in the distant centre-west and flanked by Lake Prespa to the centre-east and the Galičica mountains (east)

== People from Pretor ==
- Pande Eftimov (1932 - 2017), poet and journalist
- Pande Sudžov (1882 - 1927), member of the Internal Macedonian Revolutionary Organization
