= Krani =

Krani Крани Kranjë
- Village
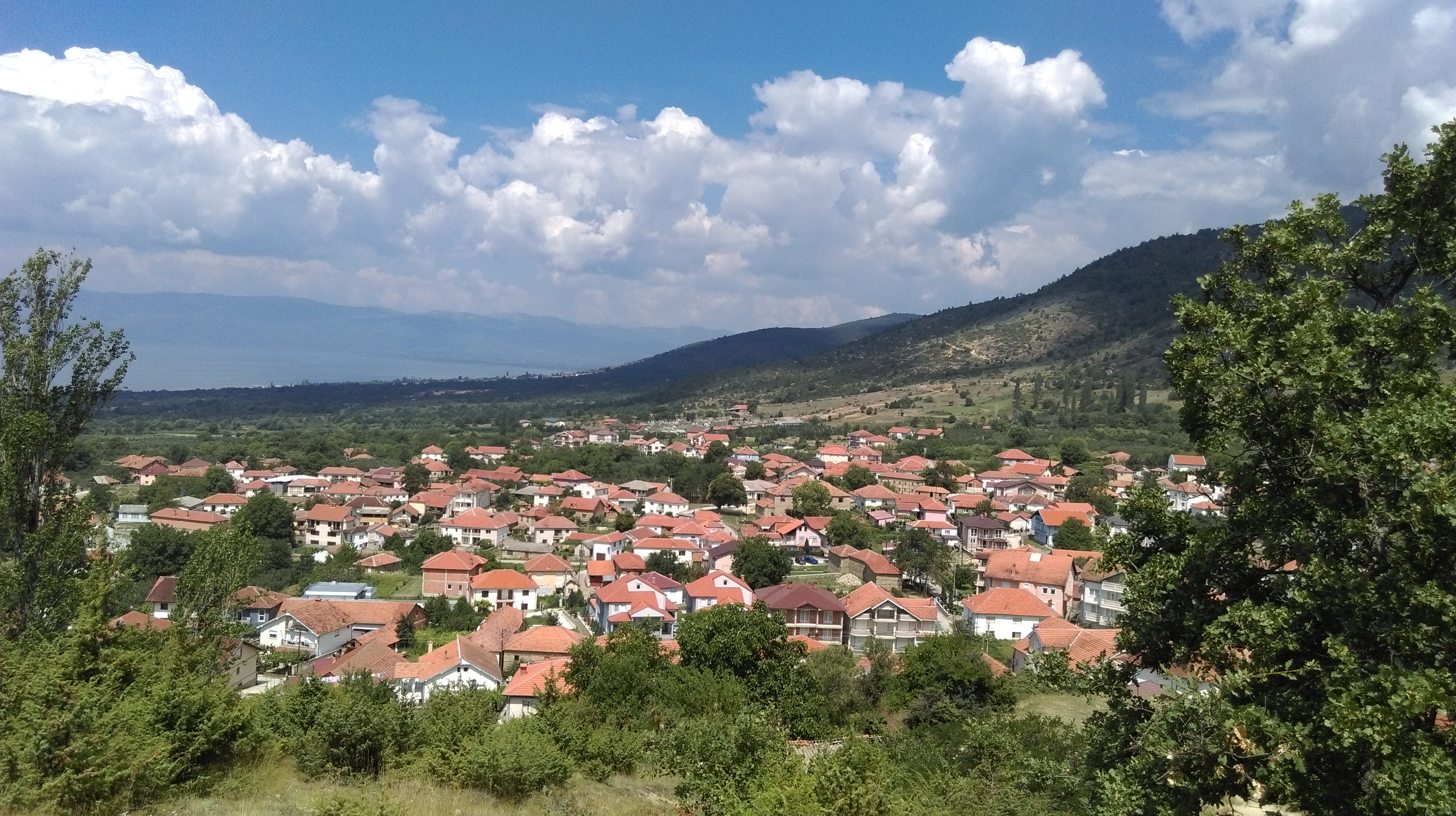
- Panoramic view of the village Krani

- Location within North Macedonia
- Coordinates: 40°56′22.73″N 21°6′29.26″E
- Country: North Macedonia
- Region: Pelagonia
- Municipality: Resen

Population (2021)
  - Total: 361
- Time zone: UTC+1 (CET)
  - Summer (DST): UTC+2 (CEST)
- Area code: +389
- Car plates: RE

Krani (Macedonian: Крани; Albanian: Kranjë) is a village in the Resen Municipality in North Macedonia, roughly 19 kilometres (12 mi) south of the municipal centre of Resen.

== History ==
Krani has four known archaeological sites, two of which are from the Middle Ages, one from Late Antiquity, and one from the Hellenistic era. The latter was a fishing settlement and the two from the Middle Ages were churches.

In 1905, Arvati's population consisted of 256 Macedonians and 342 Albanians. There was a Macedonian school in the village.

== Demographics ==
Krani is inhabited by a Sunni Muslim Albanian majority and an Orthodox Macedonian minority. A small number of Albanian speaking Muslim Romani used to live in Krani and during the latter decades of the 20th century have migrated to Ohrid and Resen. In the late Ottoman period, some Bektashi Albanians, known locally as Kolonjarë, used to also reside in the village of Krani. The national census in 2002 showed that Krani had 416 residents, less than half of its 1961 population.

Ethnic group	census 1961		census 1971		census 1981		census 1991		census 1994		census 2002		census 2021	
Ethnic group	Number	%	Number	%	Number	%	Number	%	Number	%	Number	%	Number	%
Macedonians	336	32.0	336	27.8	350	32.2	337	33.7	136	25.7	103	24.8	74	20.5
Albanians	711	67.7	867	71.8	709	65.2	639	63.8	373	70.5	305	73.3	263	72.9
Serbs	1	0.0	3	0.2	1	0.0	2	0.2	0	0.0	1	0.2	0	0.00
others	2	0.2	1	0.0	27	2.5	23	2.3	20	3.8	7	1.7	24	6.6
Total	1,050		1,207		1,087		1,001		529		416		361	

The data on the mother tongues of Krani's residents, according to the 2002 census, is very similar to the ethnic makeup of the village with 311 declaring Albanian their mother tongue, followed by 104 declaring Macedonian, and one declaring Serbian.

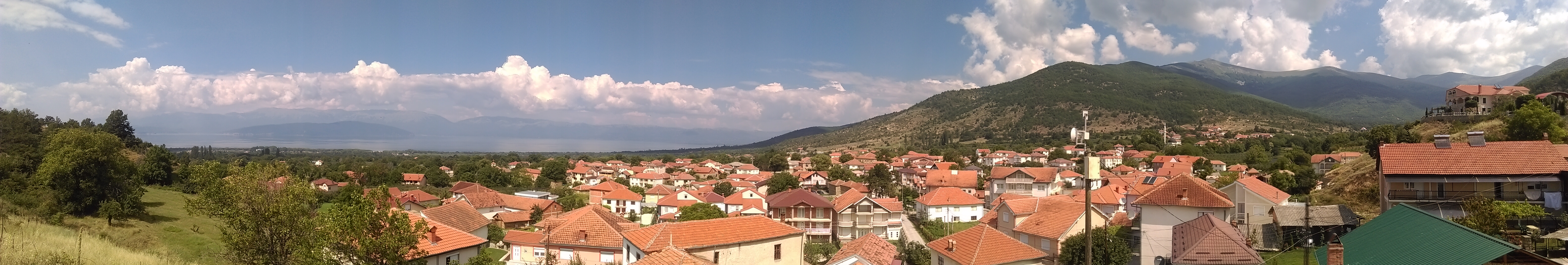
Panorama of Krani showing Lake Prespa to the west and beyond the mosque, Arvati village to far east

=== Religion ===
The main religions in the village are Islam and Orthodox Christianity, with 309 belonging to the former and 105 to the latter, as of the latest census. Additionally, two individuals declared Catholicism as their religion. These figures suggest that the ethnic Macedonian population is Orthodox Christian, while the Albanian population is Muslim, as is the case nationally.

Krani has two churches, the Church of the Dormition of the Virgin Mary and the Church of St Nicholas. It also has one mosque.

== Gallery ==
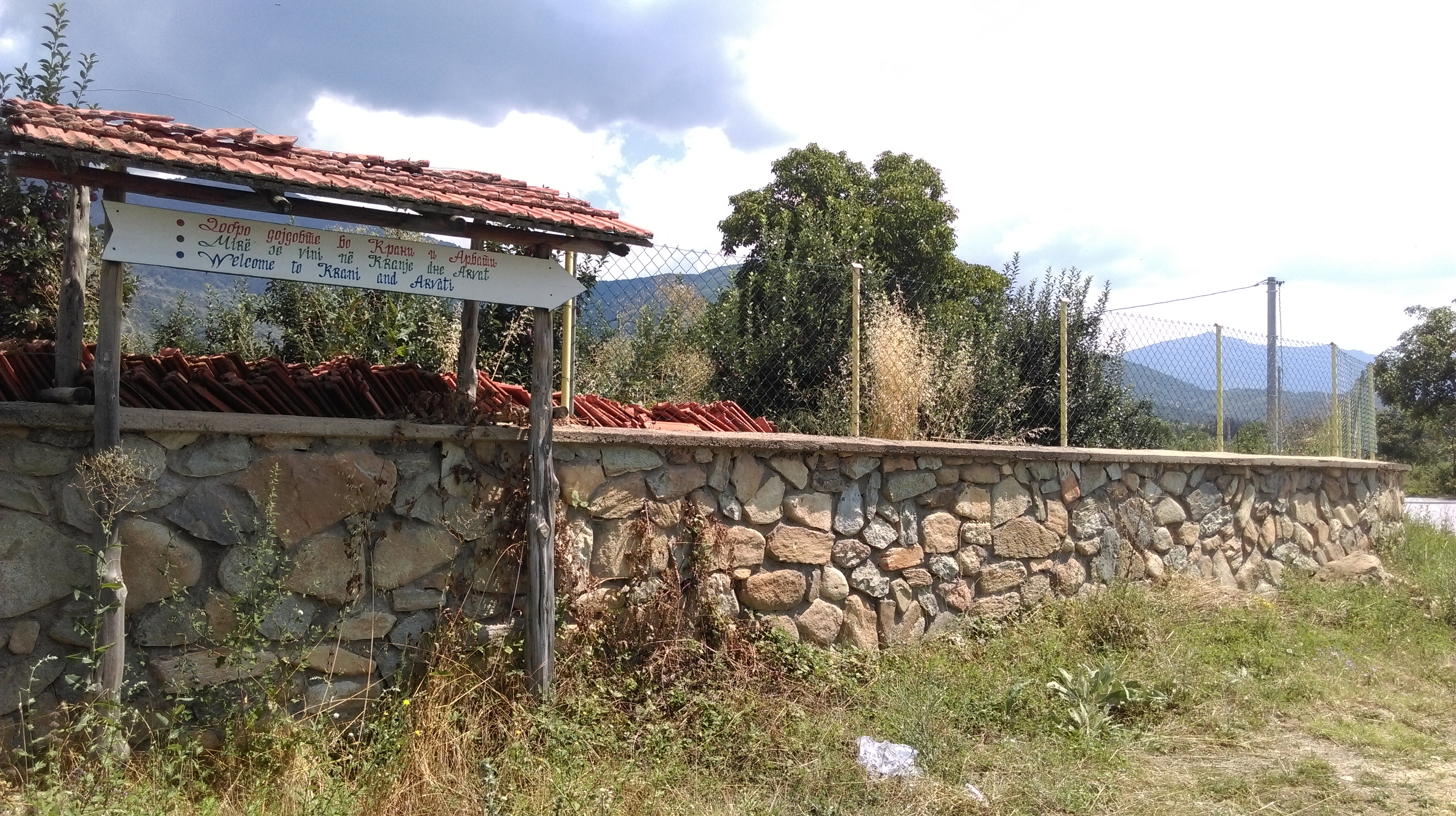
Trilingual sign hailing entrance on road to both the villages of Krani and Arvati, in Krani

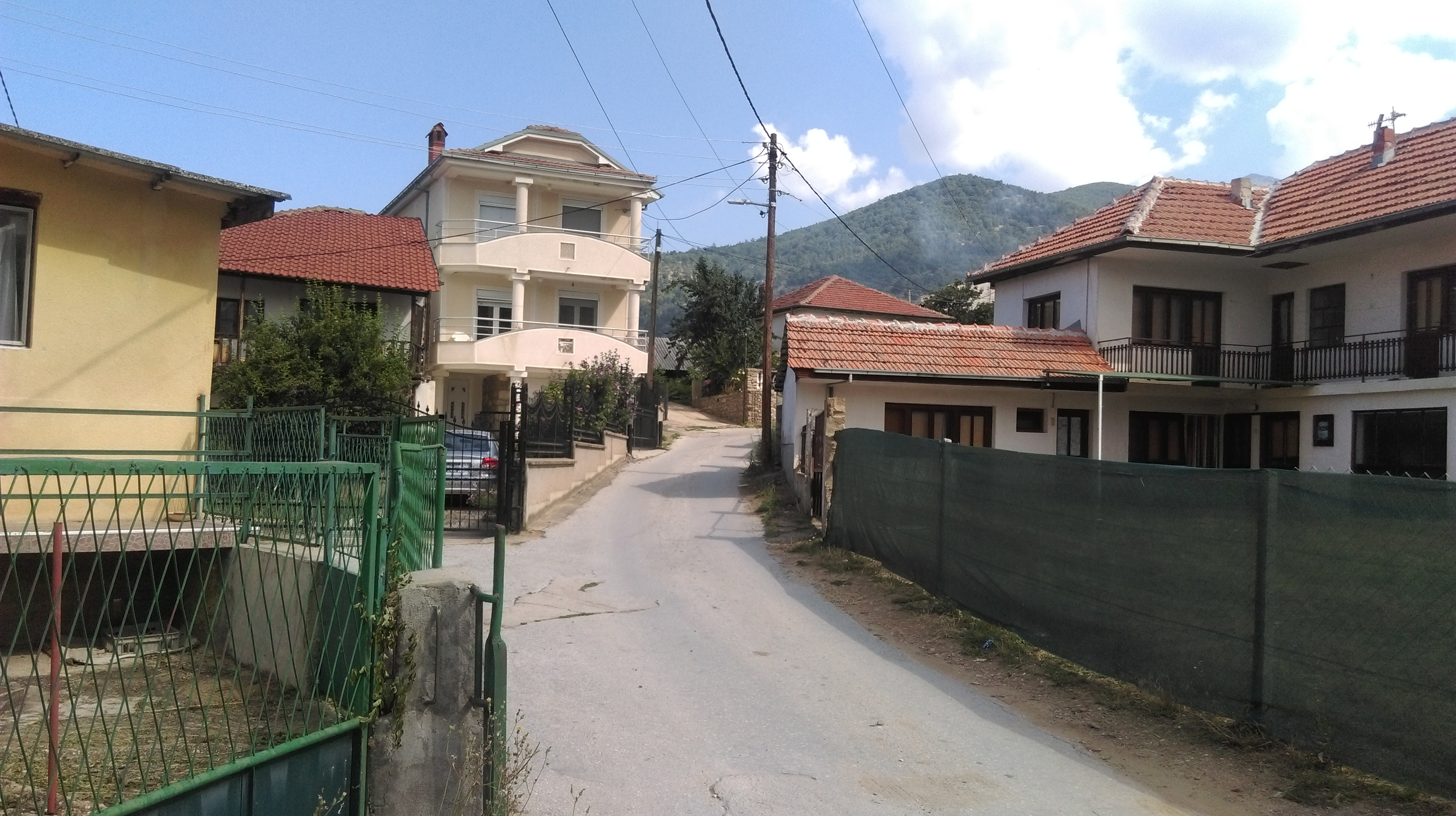
Architecture of Krani

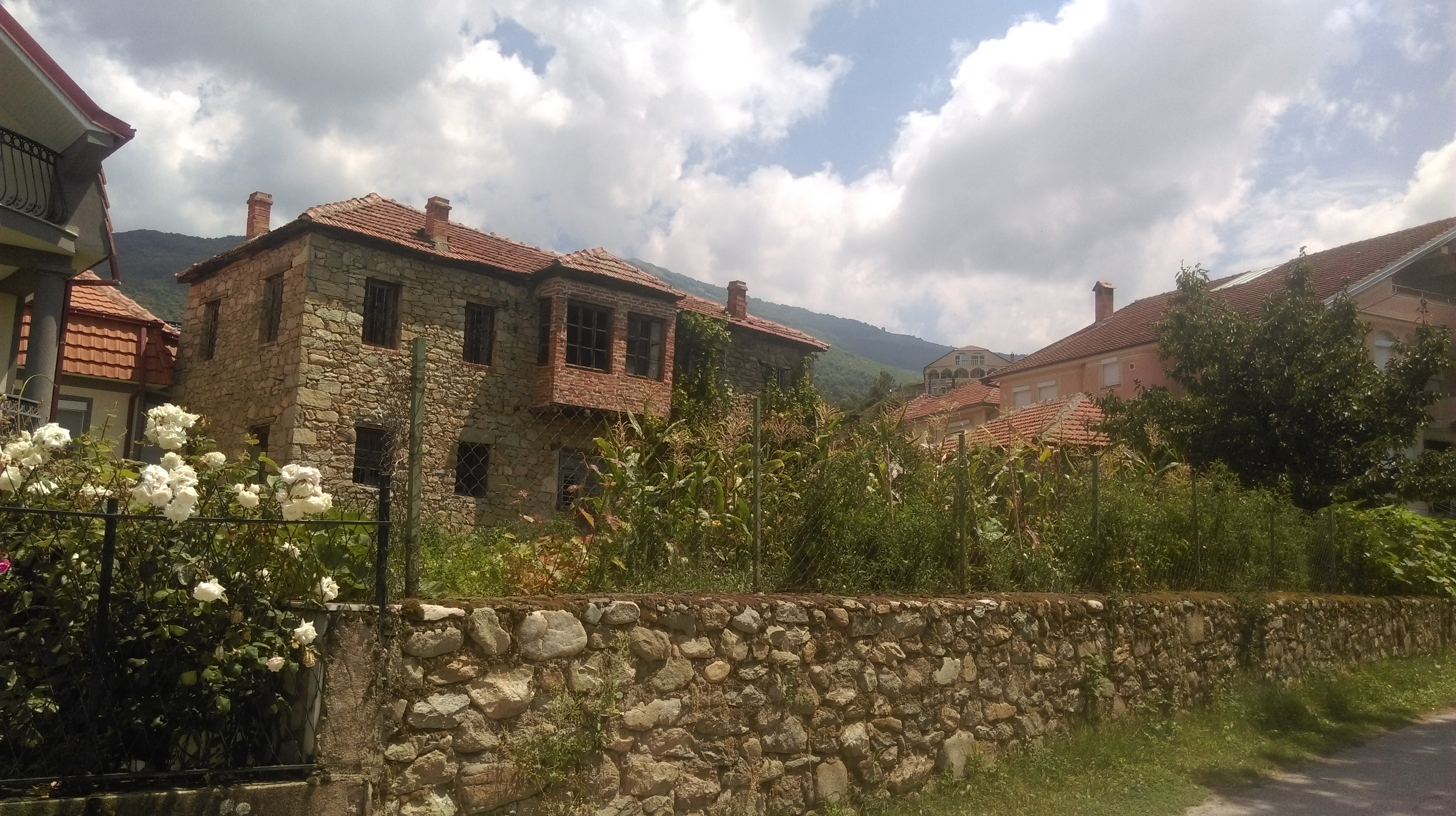
Traditional architecture of Krani

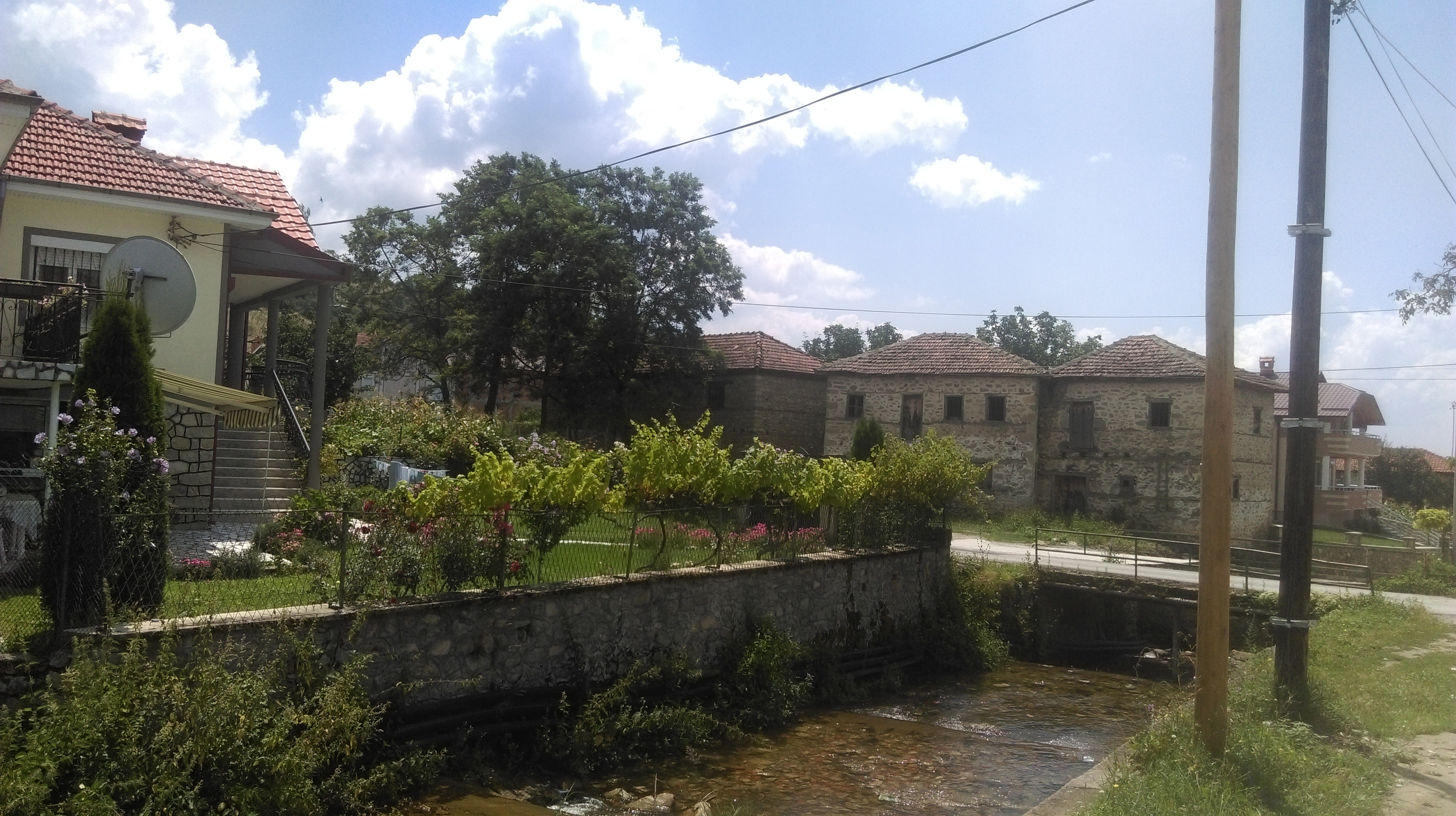
Krani River and traditional architecture of Krani

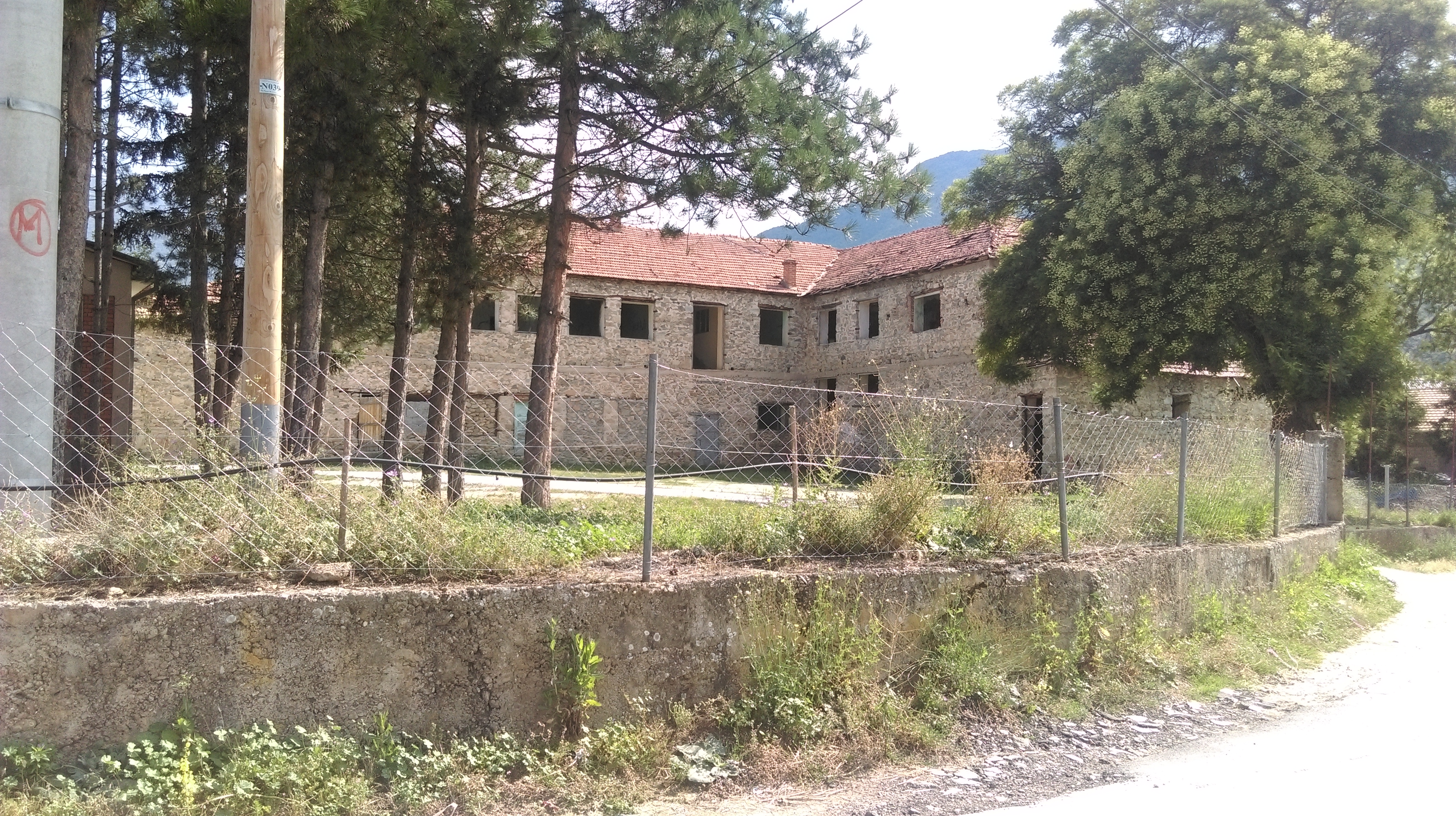
Old school of Krani (now disused)

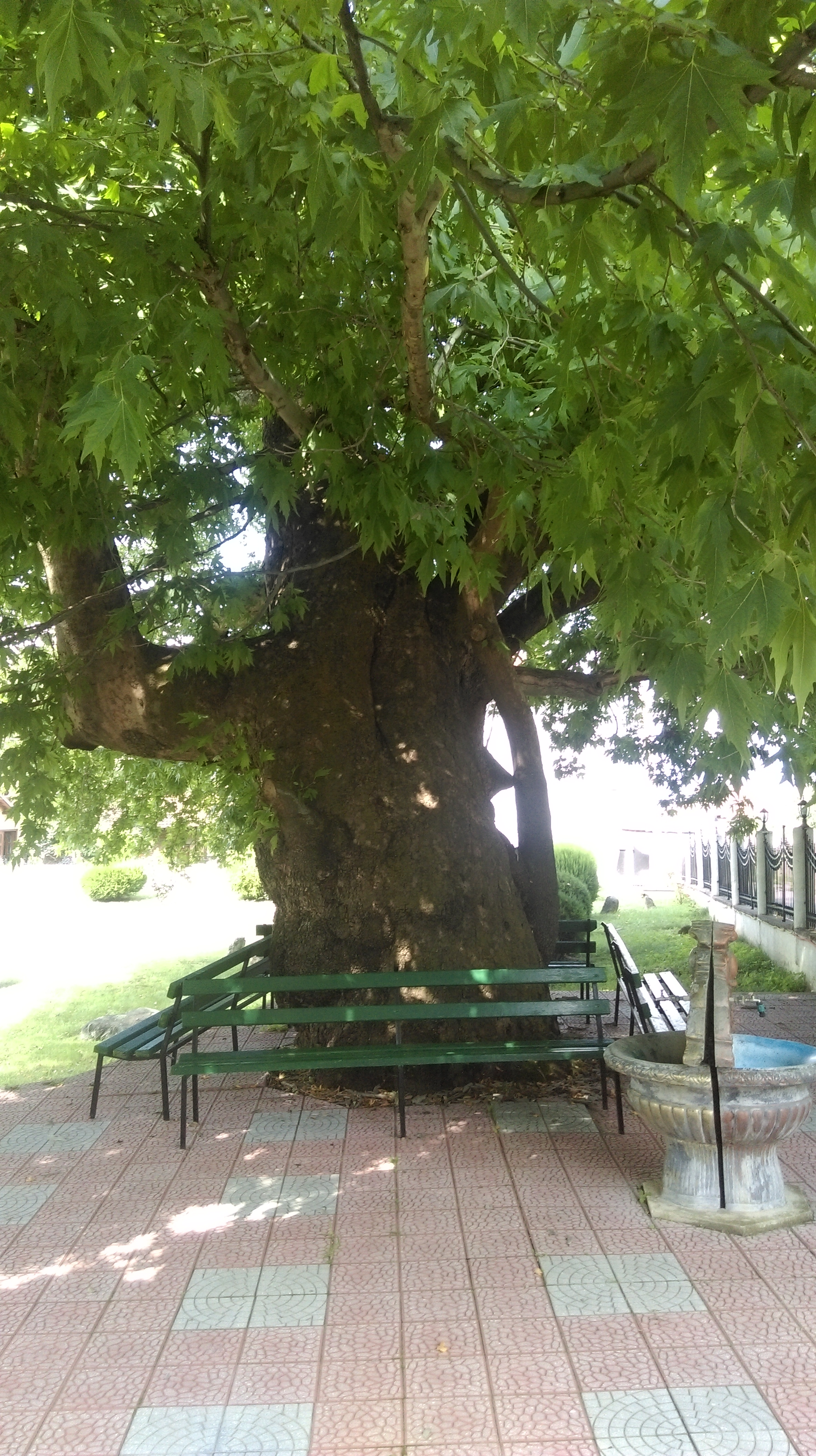
Centuries-old plane tree in mosque yard

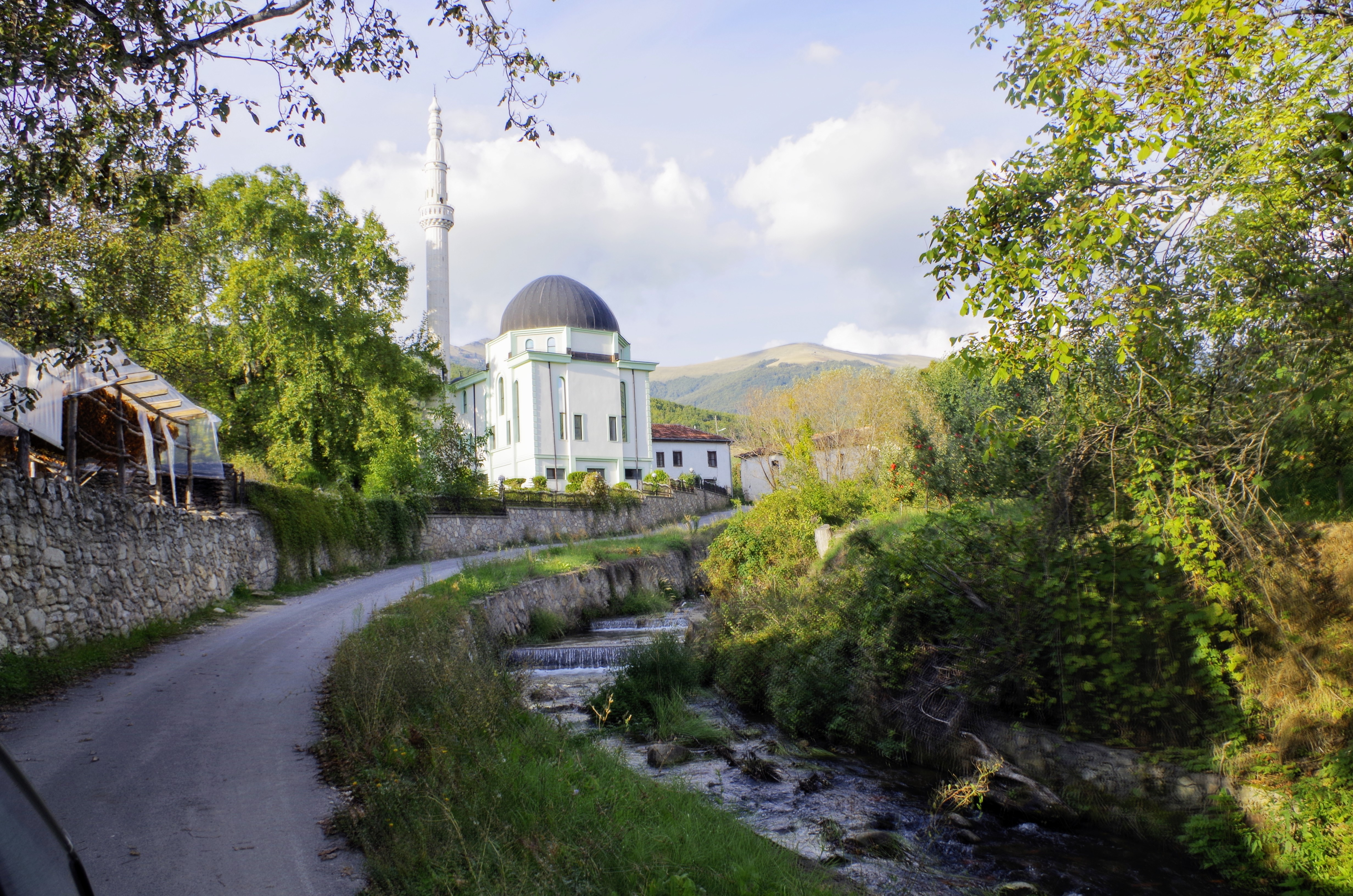
Mosque of Krani

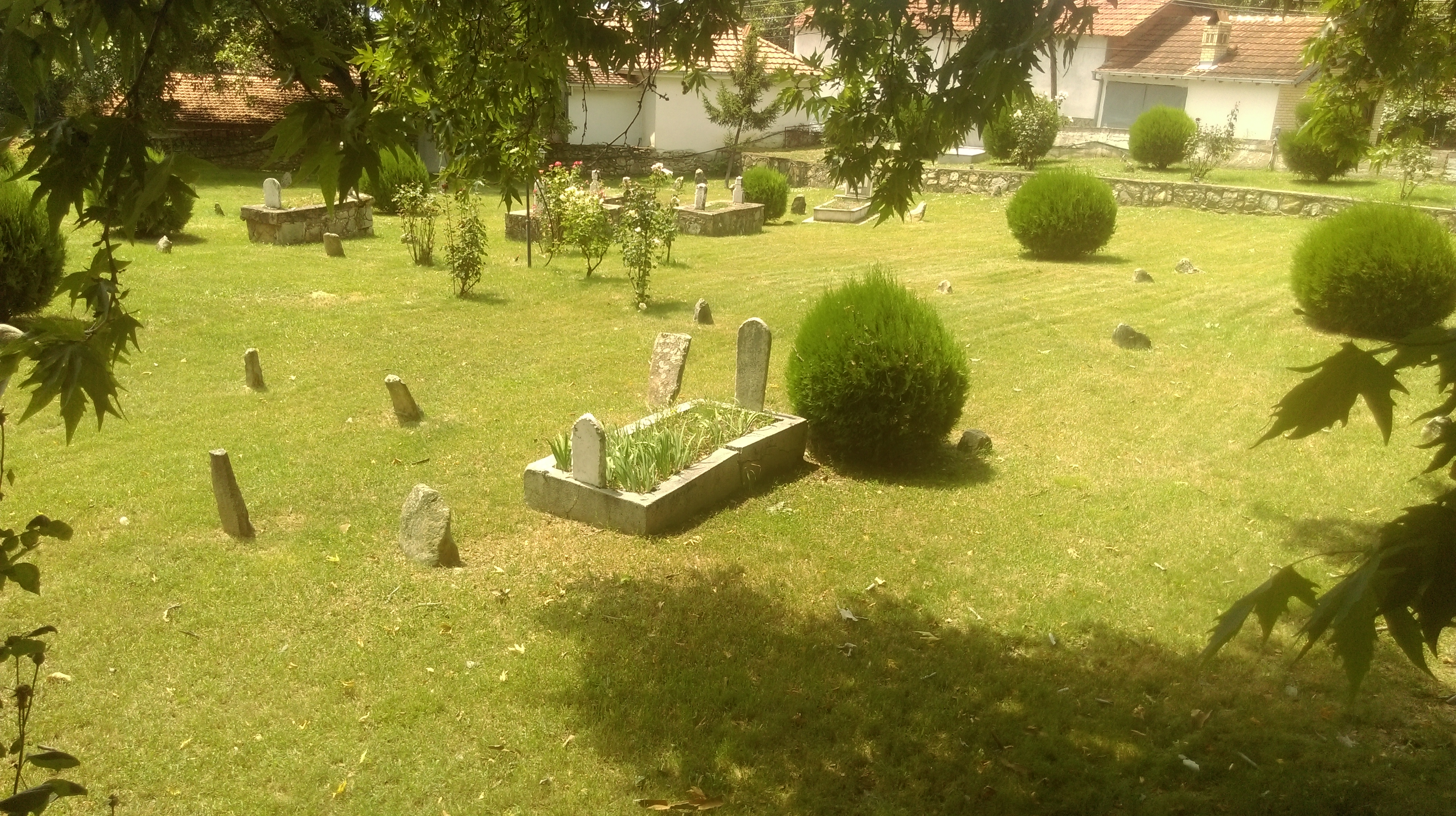
Old Muslim cemetery of Krani (Ottoman era - mid 20th century)

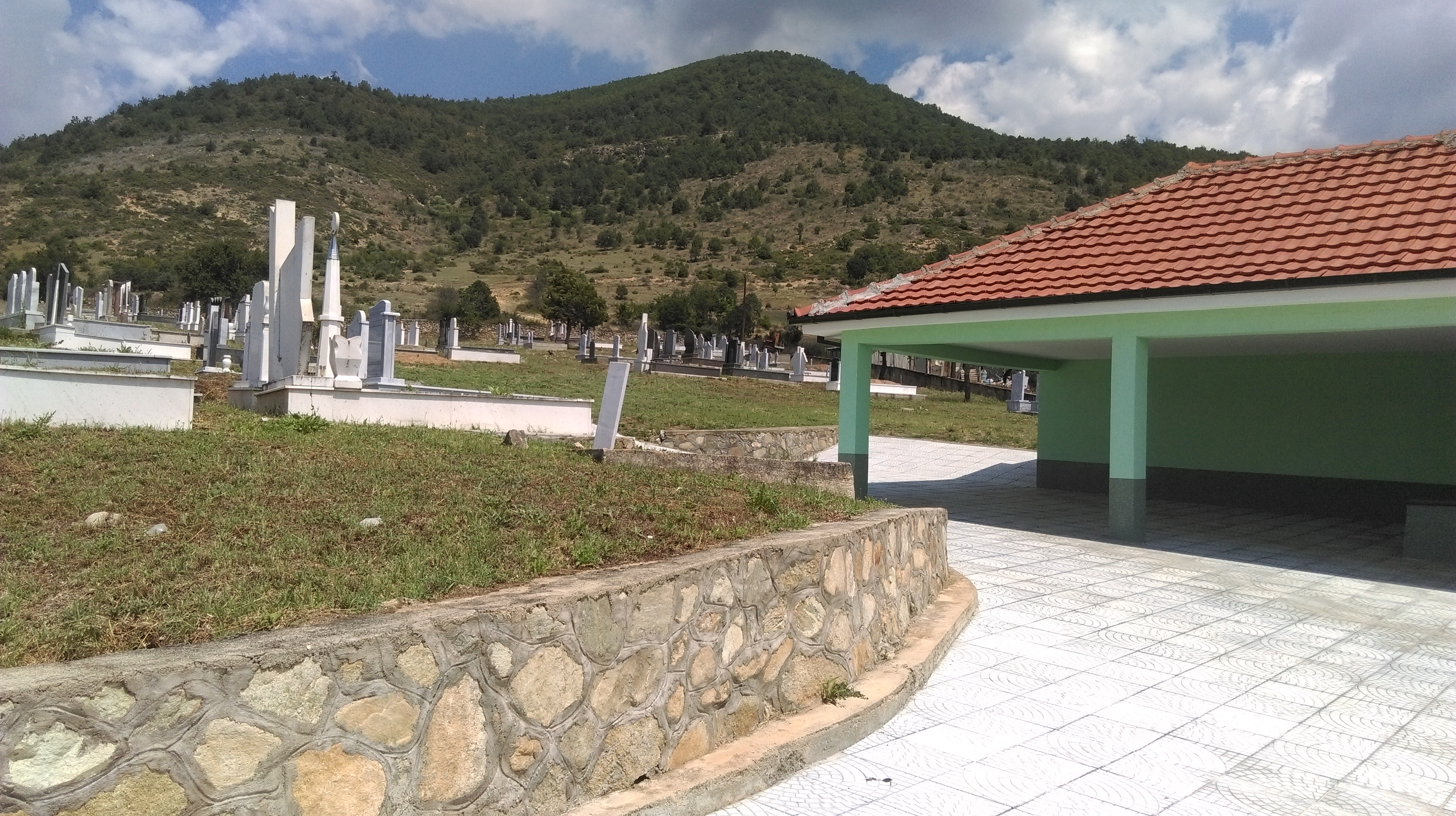
Muslim cemetery of Krani

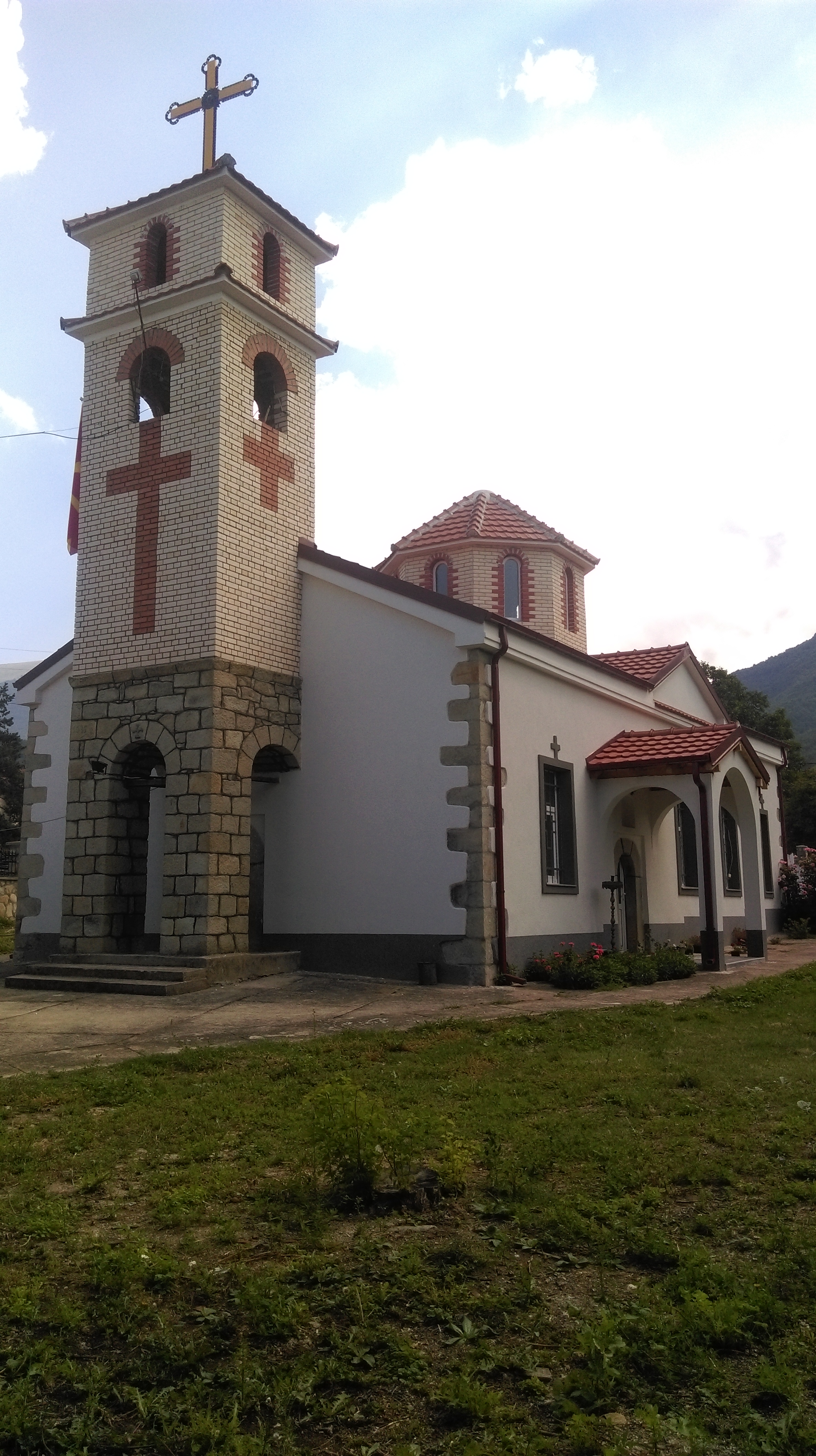
Orthodox church of Krani

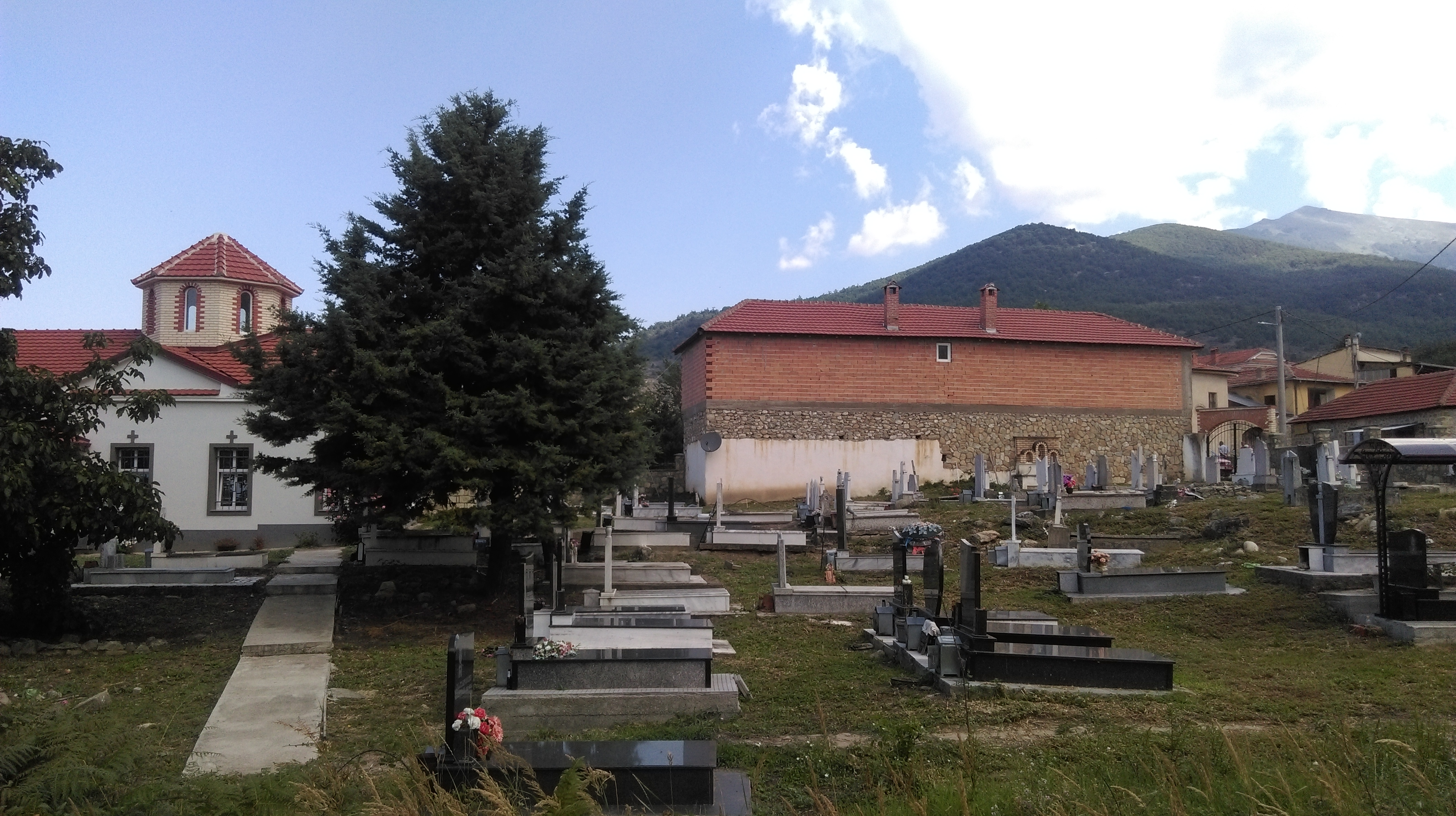
Orthodox church and cemetery of Krani

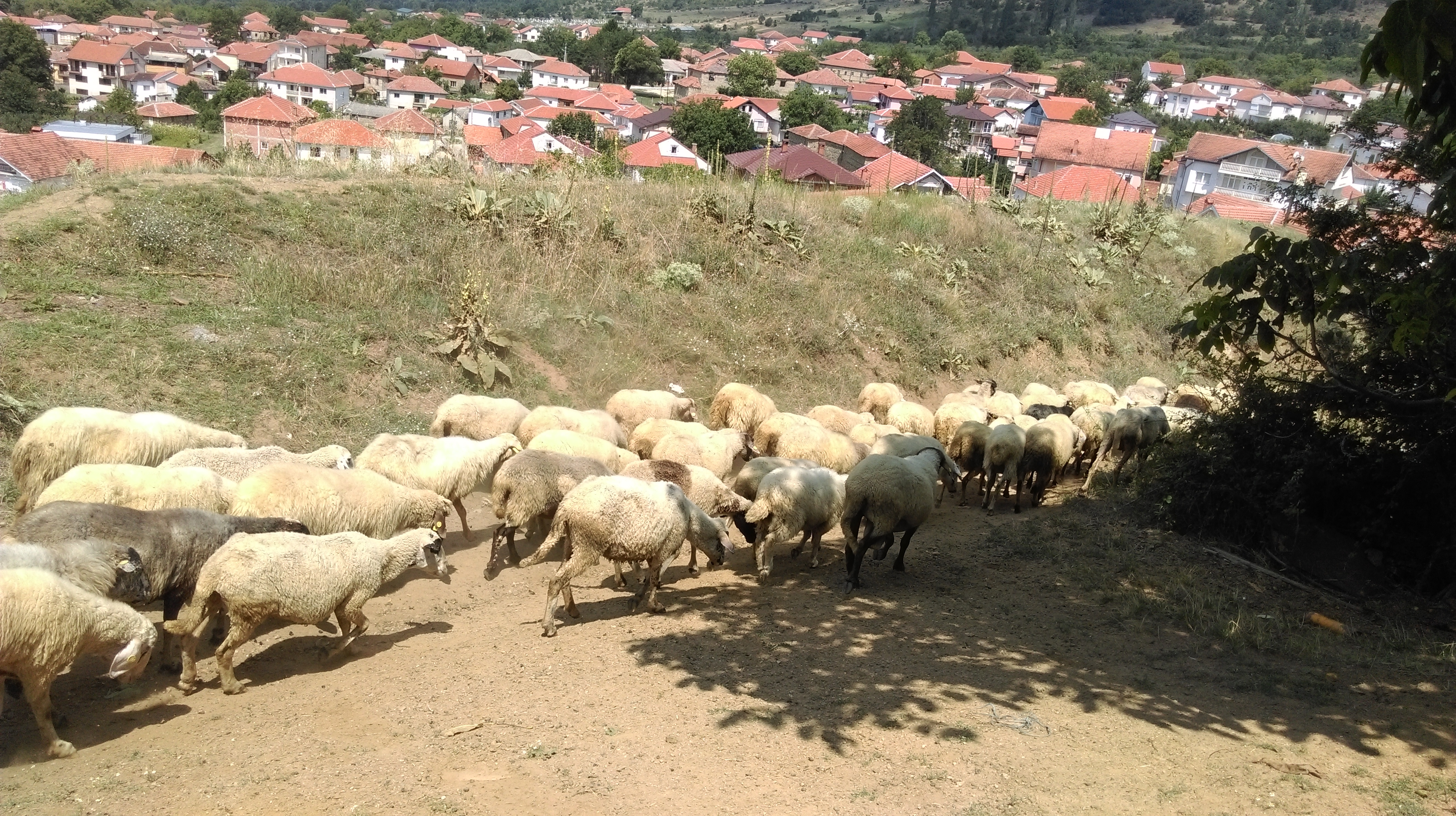
Sheep in Krani

== People from Krani ==
- Ali Aliu (born 1934), writer and translator
