= Asamati =

Asamati may refer to:

- Asamati, Resen, a village in the North Macedonia
- A minor Hindu deity described in Mandala 10
- The name of a king, with the patronymic Râthaprośṭha, according to the Anukramani
