= Asamati, Resen =

Asamati Асамати Asamat
- Village
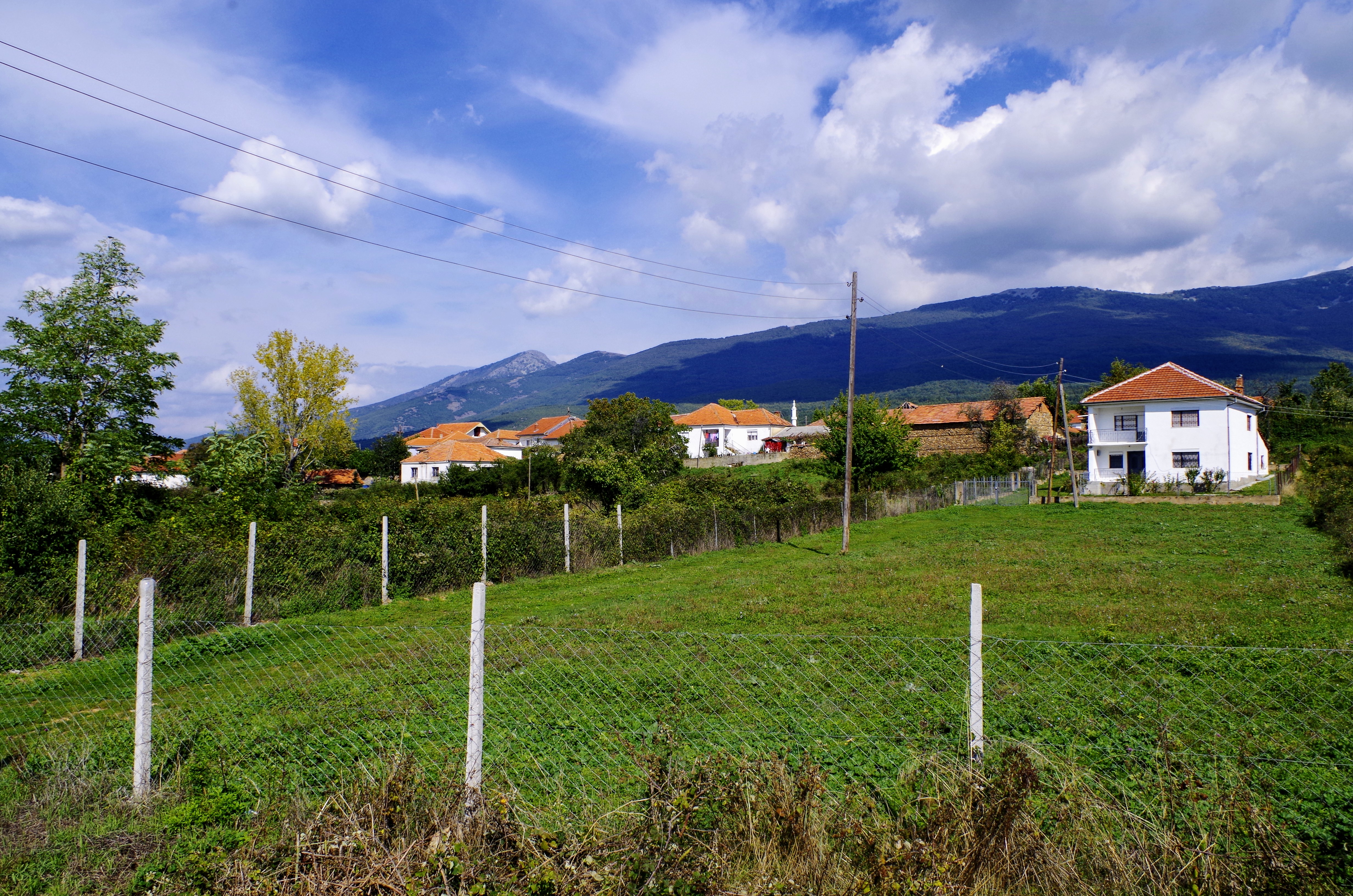
- View of the village Asamati

- Location within North Macedonia
- Coordinates: 40°59′11″N 21°03′03″E
- Country: North Macedonia
- Region: Pelagonia
- Municipality: Resen

Population (2021)
  - Total: 168
- Time zone: UTC+1 (CET)
  - Summer (DST): UTC+2 (CEST)
- Area code: +389
- Car plates: RE

Asamati (Macedonian: Асамати; Albanian: Asamat, Osomat) is a village in the Resen Municipality of North Macedonia, on the northeastern shore of Lake Prespa. Asamati is located just over 12 kilometres (7.5 mi) from the municipal centre of Resen and has 175 residents.

== History ==
Asamati is home to several archaeological sites, dating from various historical eras, most of which were discovered by accident. Many of the findings from the sites, such as pithos and roof tiles, are housed at the Saraj in Resen.

== Demographics ==
The demographics of Asamati are written in several Bulgarian sources. According to Yordan Iliev Yordanov, Asamati in 1873 is listed as "Adamite", consisted of 16 households with 30 Muslim inhabitants and 16 Bulgarians. In 1905, D.M.Brancoff wrote Asamati had 150 inhabitants, of which 102 were Muslim Albanians and the remainder were Bulgarian Exarchists.

During World War I, the village had 115 residents.

The population of Asamati is ethnically mixed, consisting of Orthodox Macedonians living alongside Muslim Sunni and Bektashi Albanians, of whom the latter are known locally as Kolonjarë. It is the only village in the municipality with no majority ethnic group.

Ethnic group	census 1961		census 1971		census 1981		census 1991		census 1994		census 2002		census 2021	
Ethnic group	Number	%	Number	%	Number	%	Number	%	Number	%	Number	%	Number	%
Macedonians	106	48.0	83	41.1	87	40.0	88	37.9	77	39.5	68	38.9	55	32.7
Albanians	65	29.4	102	50.5	106	48.6	94	40.5	97	49.7	81	46.3	91	54.2
Turks	49	22.2	17	8.4	0	0.0	22	9.5	21	10.8	26	14.9	16	9.5
others	1	0.5	0	0.0	25	11.5	28	12.1	0	0.0	0	0.0	6	3.6
Total	221		202		218		232		195		175		168	

== Gallery ==
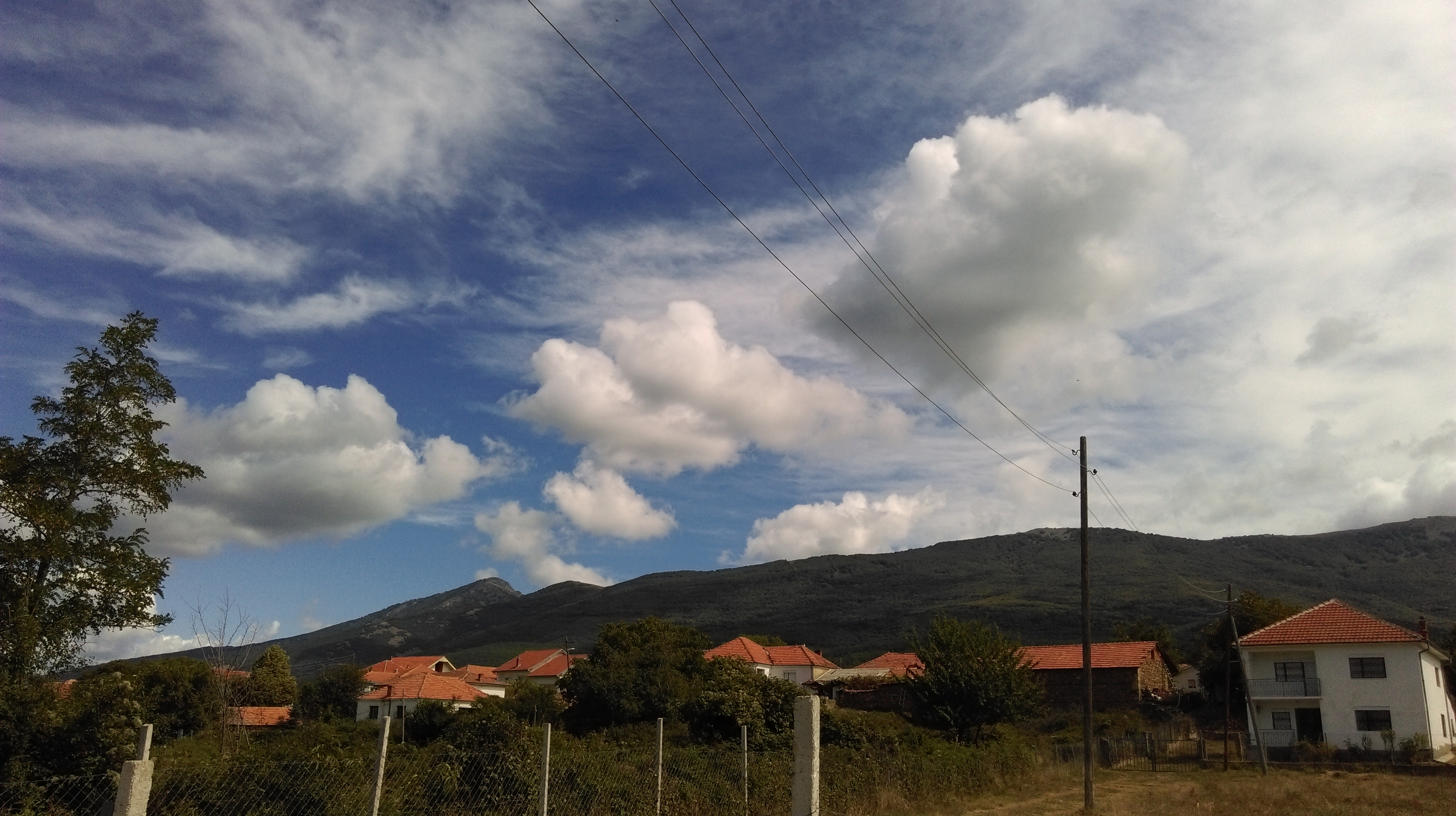
Asamati village

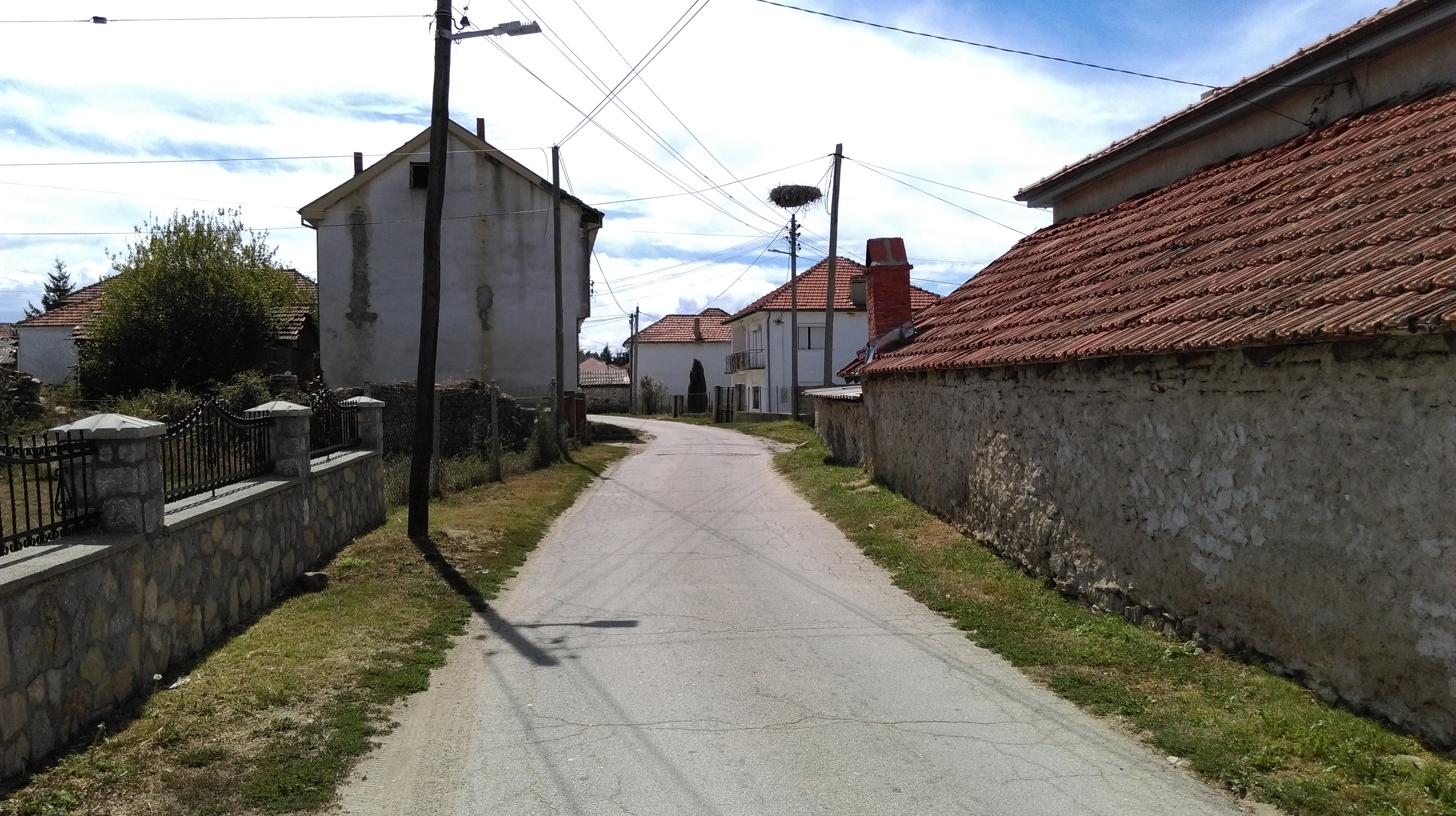
Architecture of Asamati

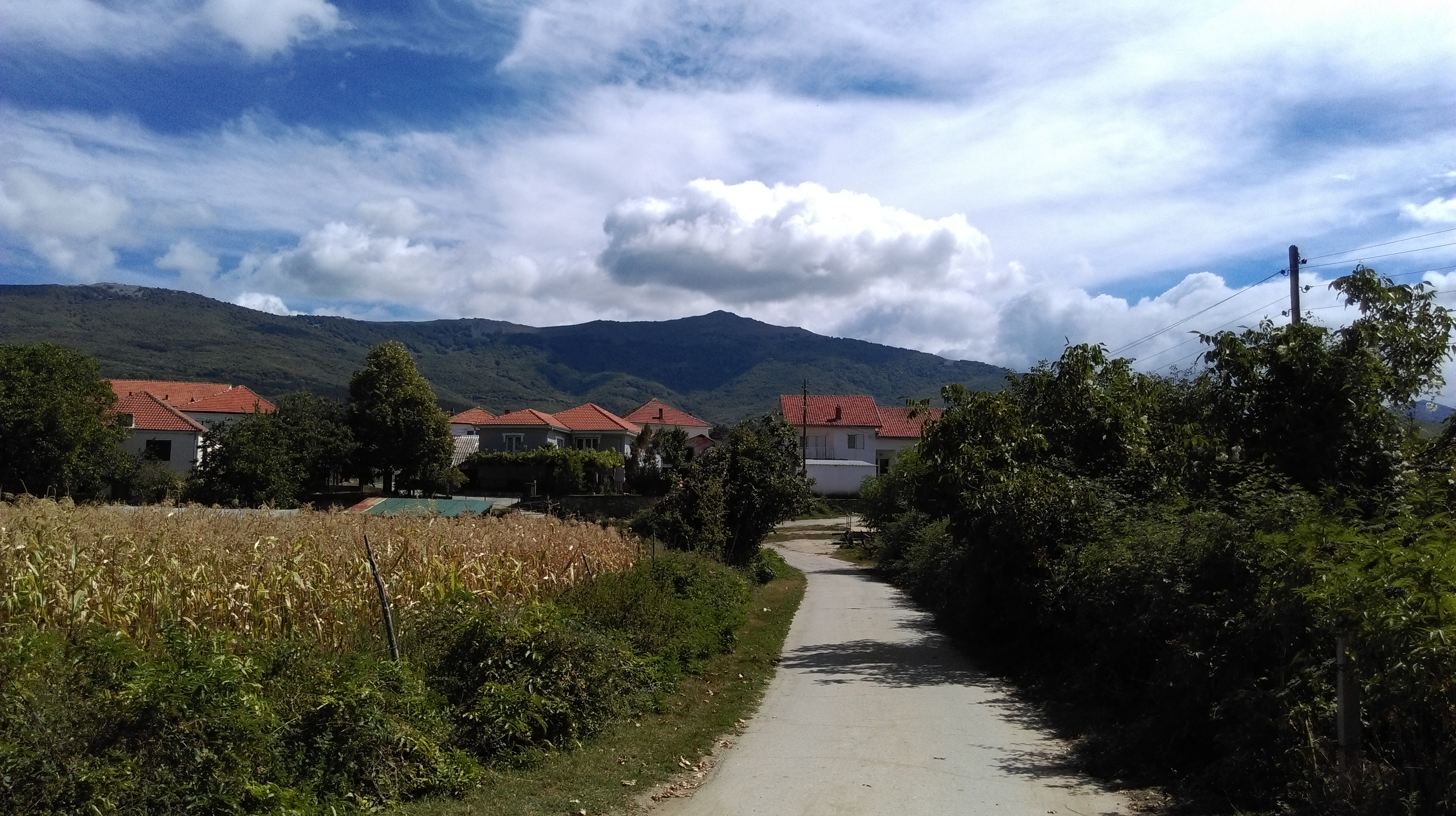
Architecture of Asamati

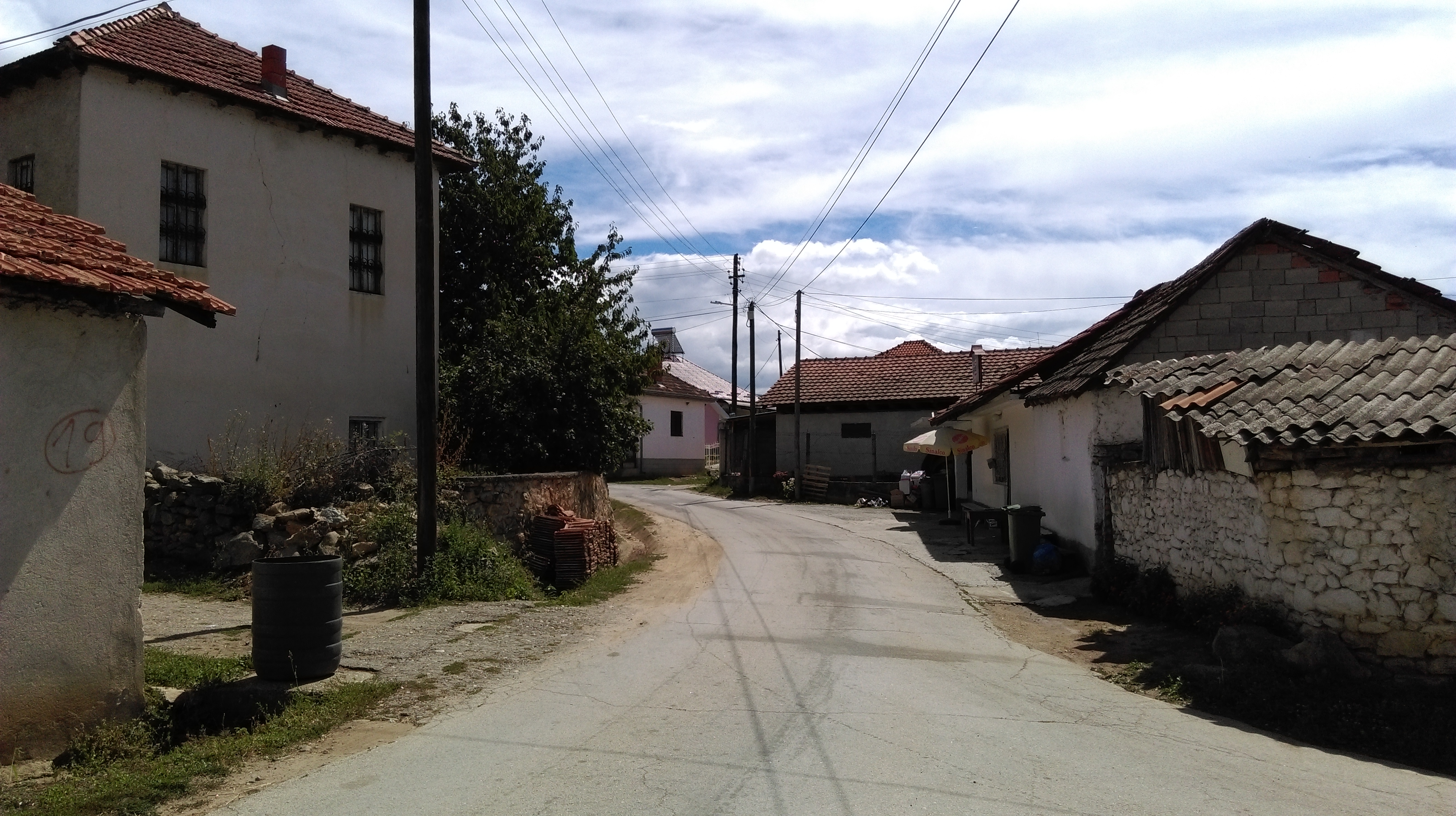
Architecture of Asamati

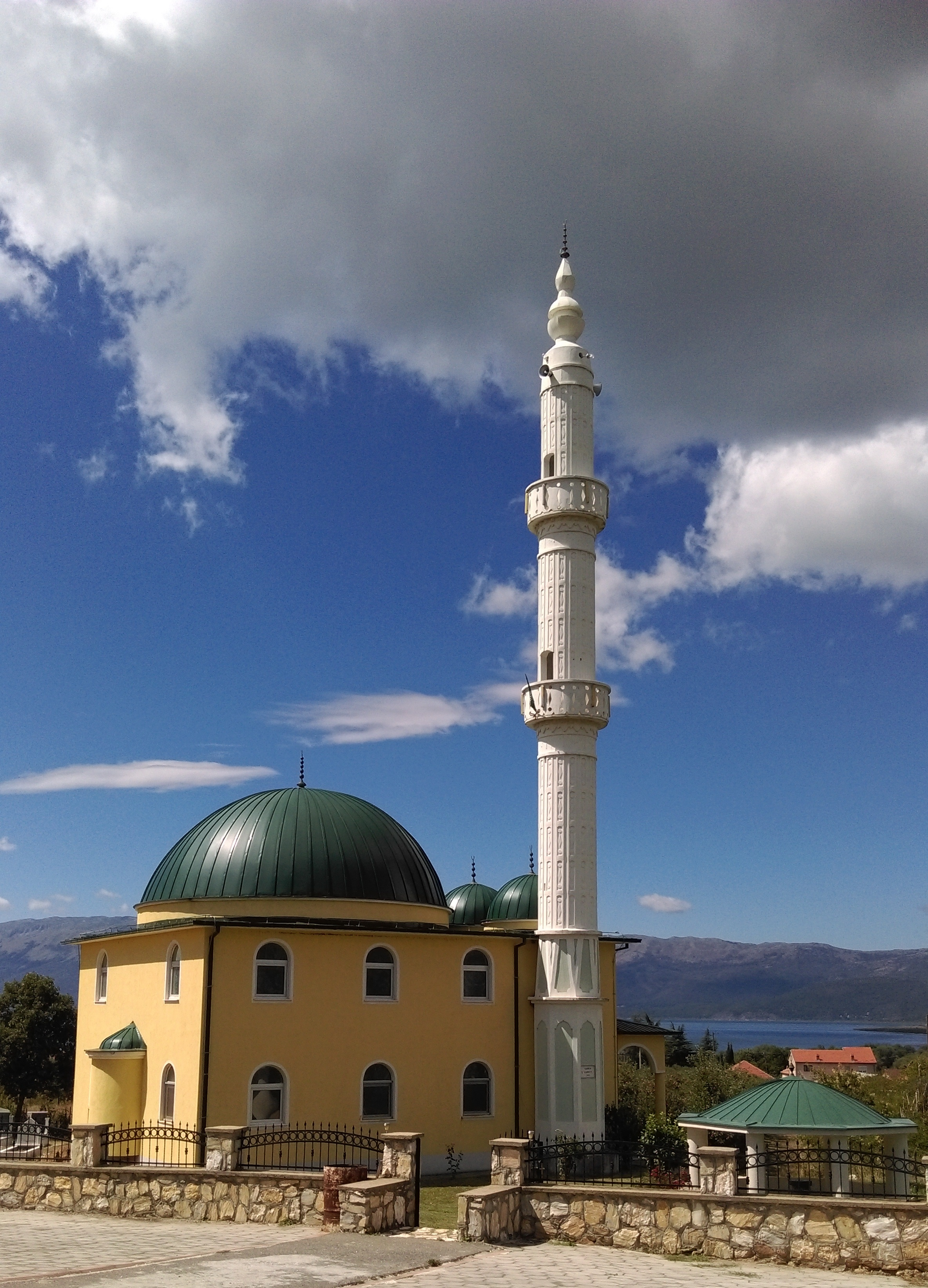
Mosque of Asamati

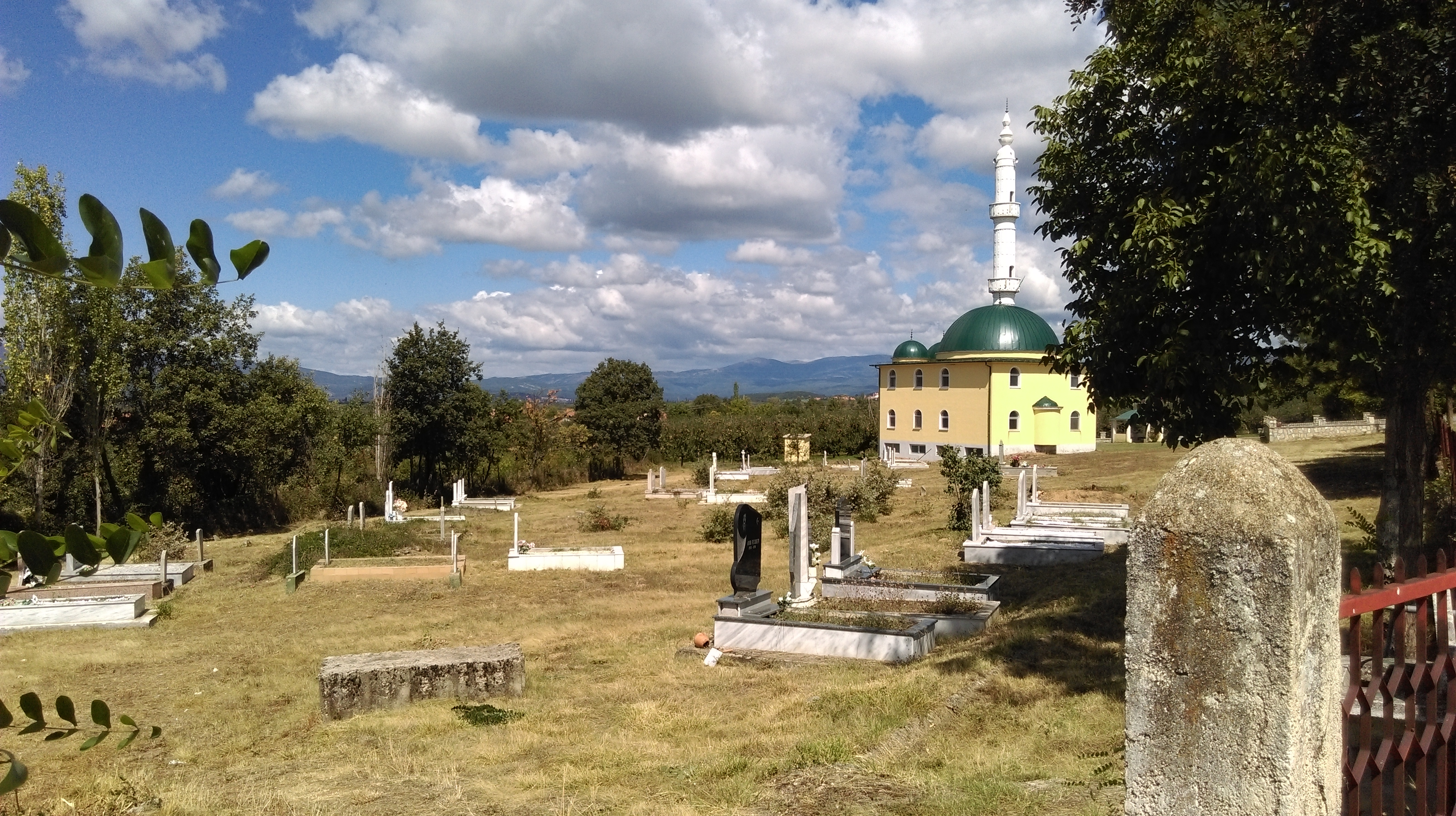
Muslim cemetery of Asamati

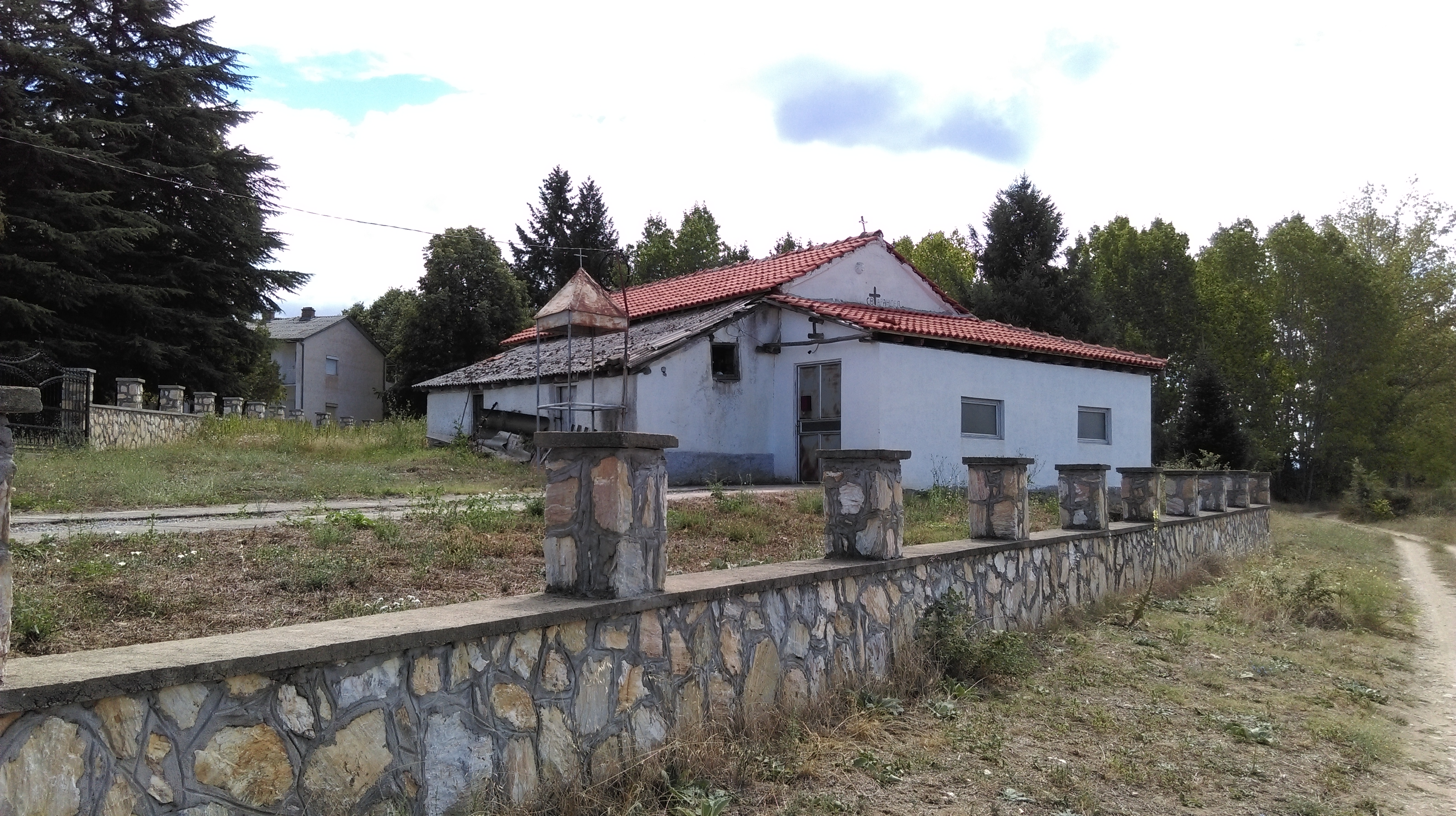
Orthodox church of Asamati

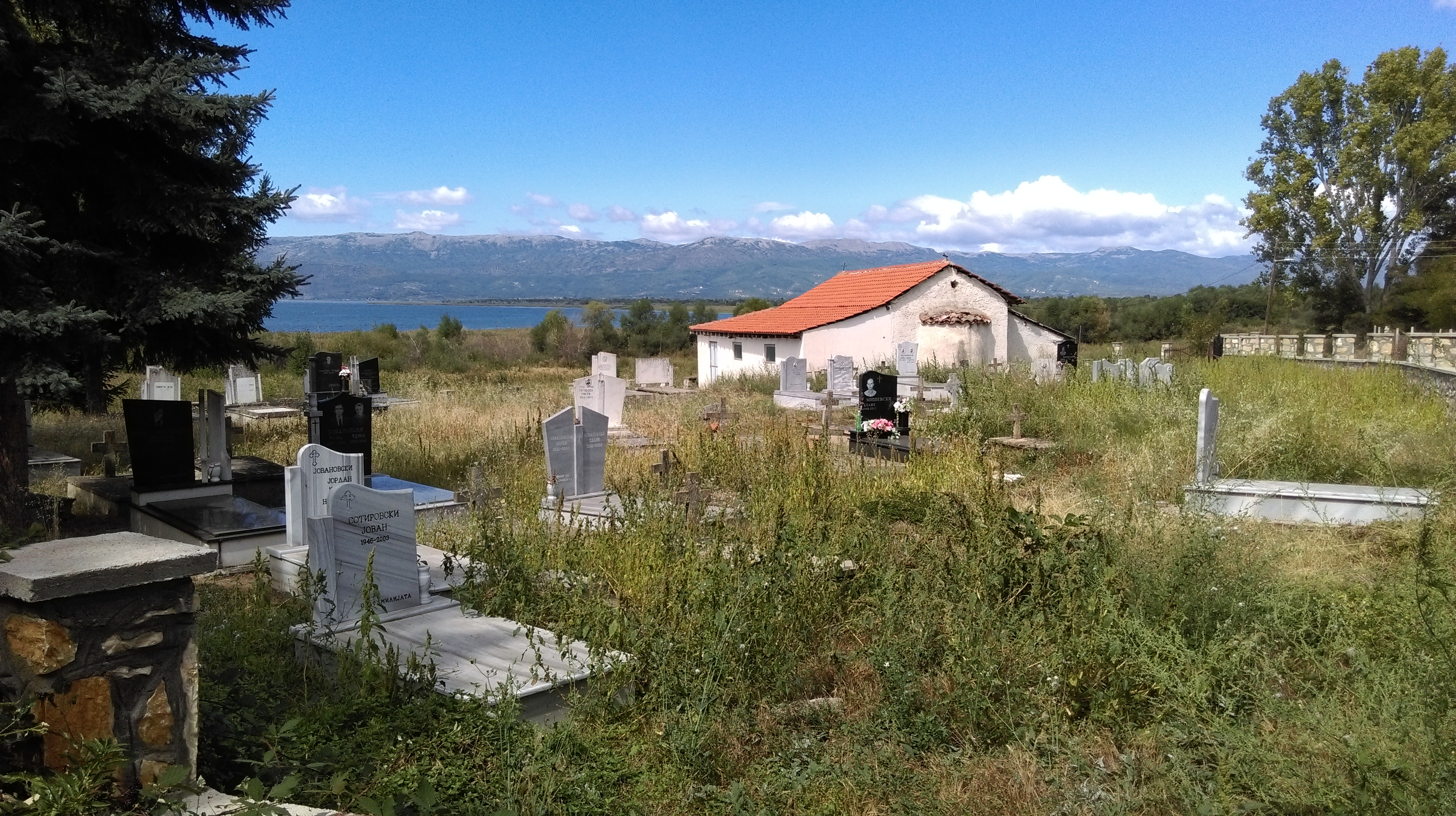
Orthodox cemetery of Asamati

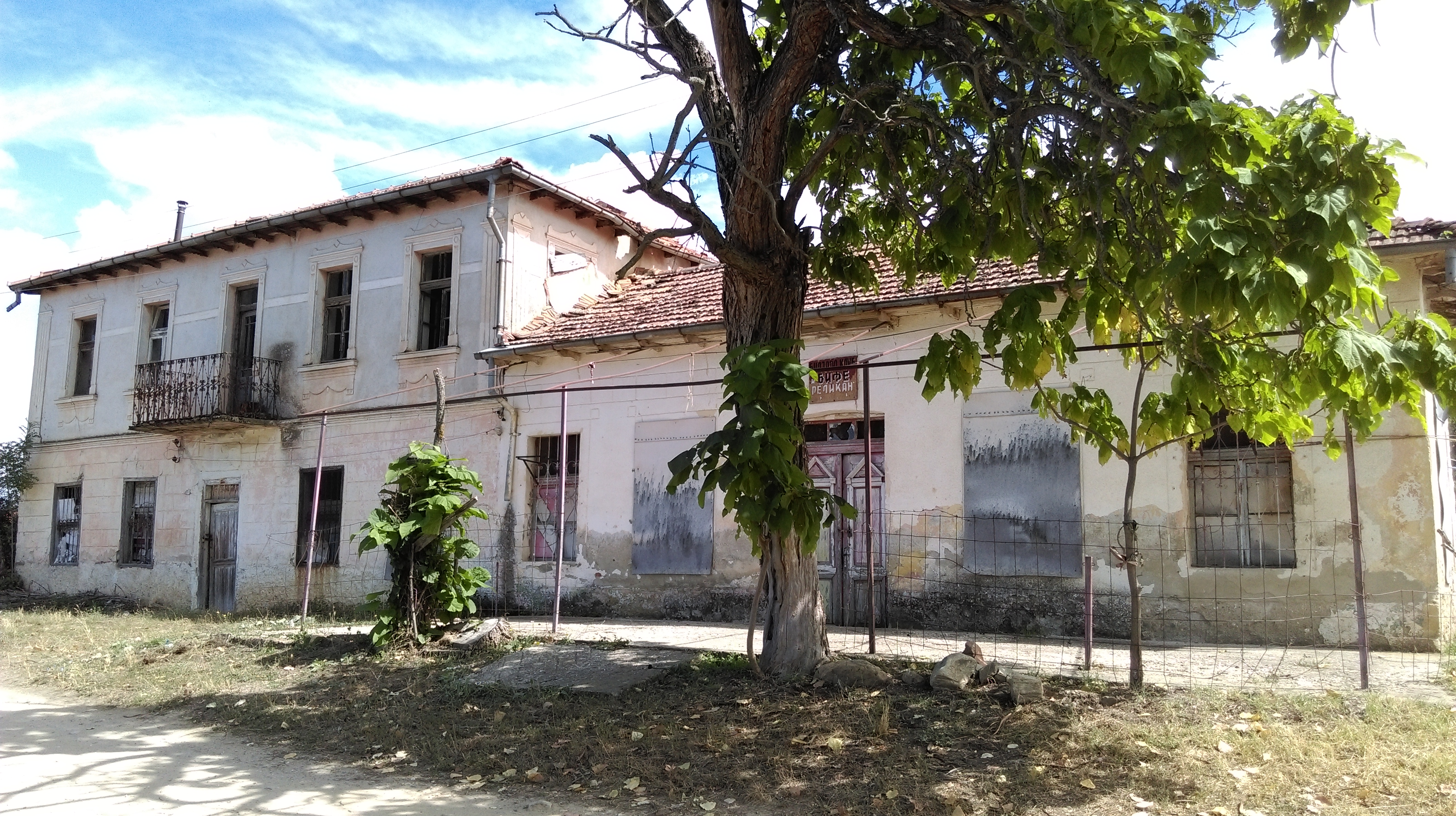
Abandoned old house and kafana near village waterfront

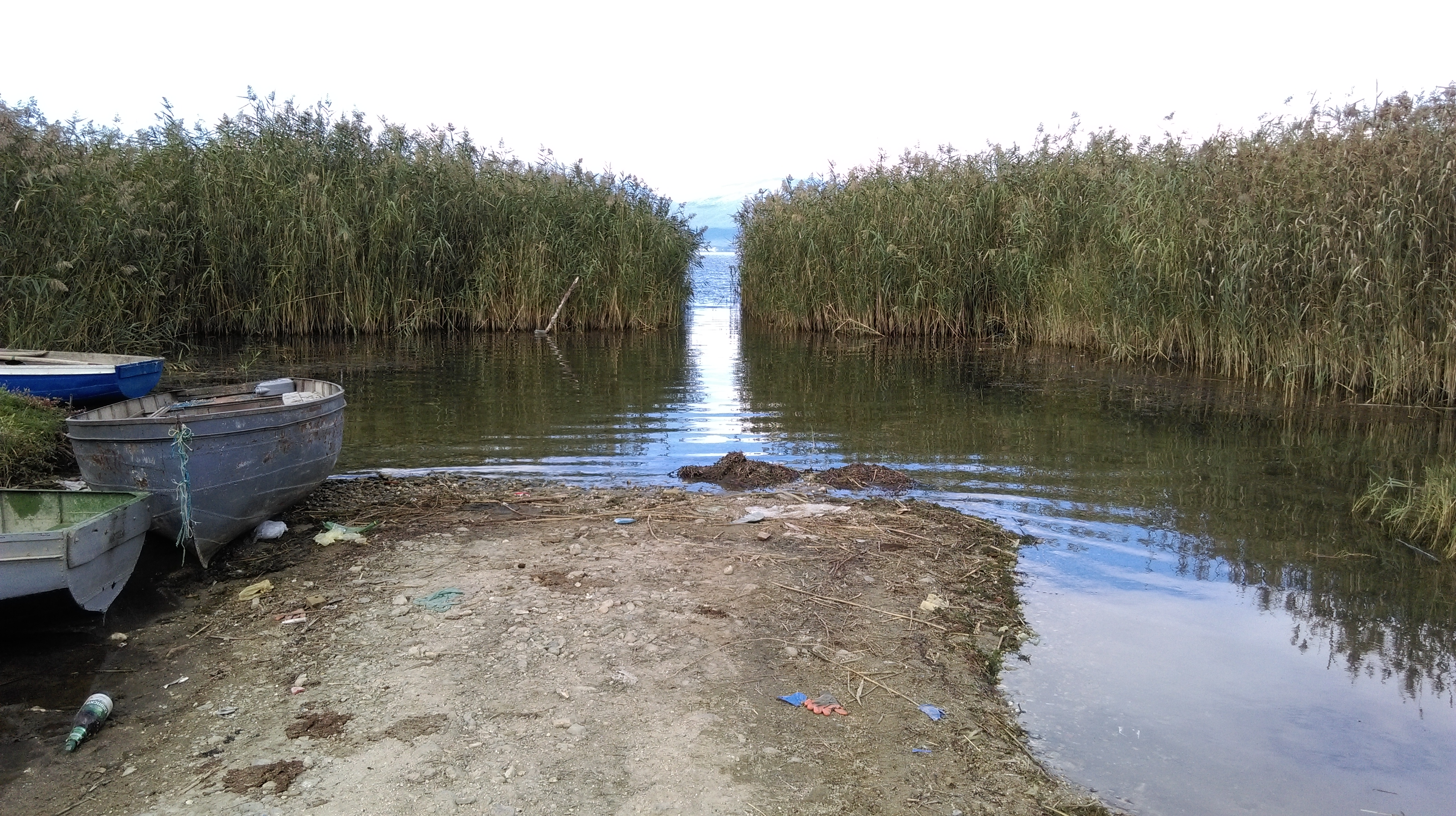
Asamati waterfront on Lake Prespa

== People from Asamati ==
- Eftim Dimitrov (1867 - ?), member of the Macedonian-Adrianopolitan Volunteer Corps
- Taip Taipi (1924 - 2001), politician
