= Nakolec =

Nakolec Наколец
- Village
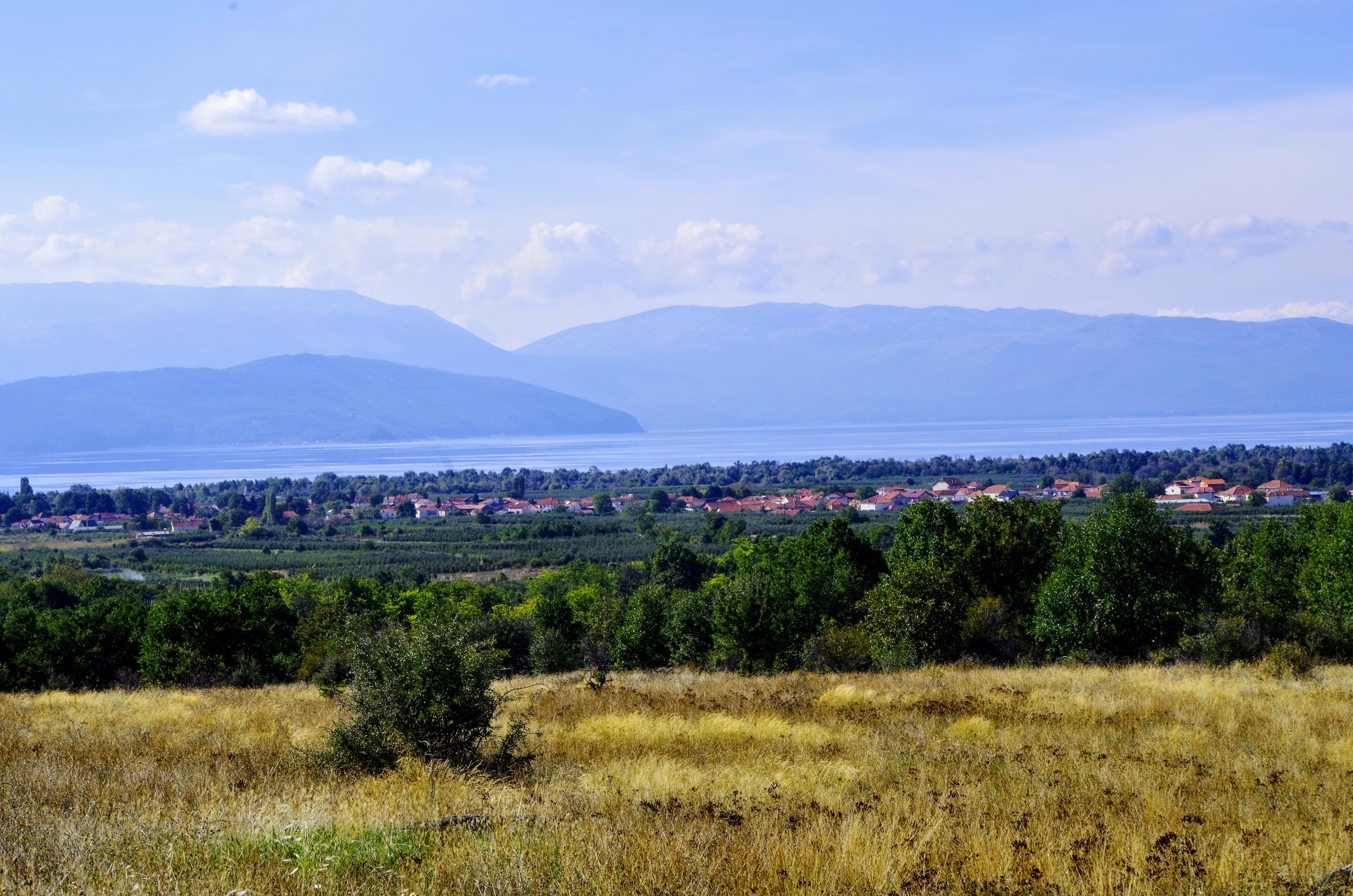
- Nakolec with Lake Prespa in the background

- Location within North Macedonia
- Coordinates: 40°53′36.39″N 21°6′31.69″E
- Country: North Macedonia
- Region: Pelagonia
- Municipality: Resen

Population (2021)
  - Total: 212
- Time zone: UTC+1 (CET)
  - Summer (DST): UTC+2 (CEST)
- Area code: +389
- Car plates: RE

Nakolec (Macedonian: Наколец; Albanian: Nakolec) is a village on Lake Prespa in Resen Municipality in the Republic of North Macedonia. It is located roughly 23 kilometres (14 mi) south of the municipal centre of Resen.

== Demographics ==
The village of Nakolec has a Sunni Albanian majority and an Orthodox Macedonian minority. A small number of Albanian speaking Muslim Romani used to live in Nakolec which during the latter decades of the 20th century have migrated to Ohrid and Resen. In the late Ottoman period, a few Turks and some Bektashi Albanians, known locally as Kolonjarë, used to also reside in the village of Nakolec (Turkish: Nakoleç).

Nakolec has 262 residents as of the most recent national census in 2002. The village has long had a multiethnic population.

Ethnic group	census 1961		census 1971		census 1981		census 1991		census 1994		census 2002		census 2021	
Ethnic group	Number	%	Number	%	Number	%	Number	%	Number	%	Number	%	Number	%
Macedonians	242	40.0	274	37.1	180	28.8	160	30.0	94	31.9	81	30.9	78	36.8
Albanians	391	61.4	458	62.0	439	70.1	296	55.5	175	59.3	158	60.3	115	54.3
Turks	4	0.6	5	0.7	0	0.0	0	0.0	0	0.0	0	0.0	0	0.0
Roma	0	0.0	0	0.0	0	0.0	16	3.0	16	5.4	15	5.7	7	3.3
others	0	0.0	2	0.3	7	1.1	61	11.5	10	3.4	8	3.1	4	1.9
Persons for whom data are taken from administrative sources													8	3.8
Total	637		739		626		533		295		262		212	

== Gallery ==
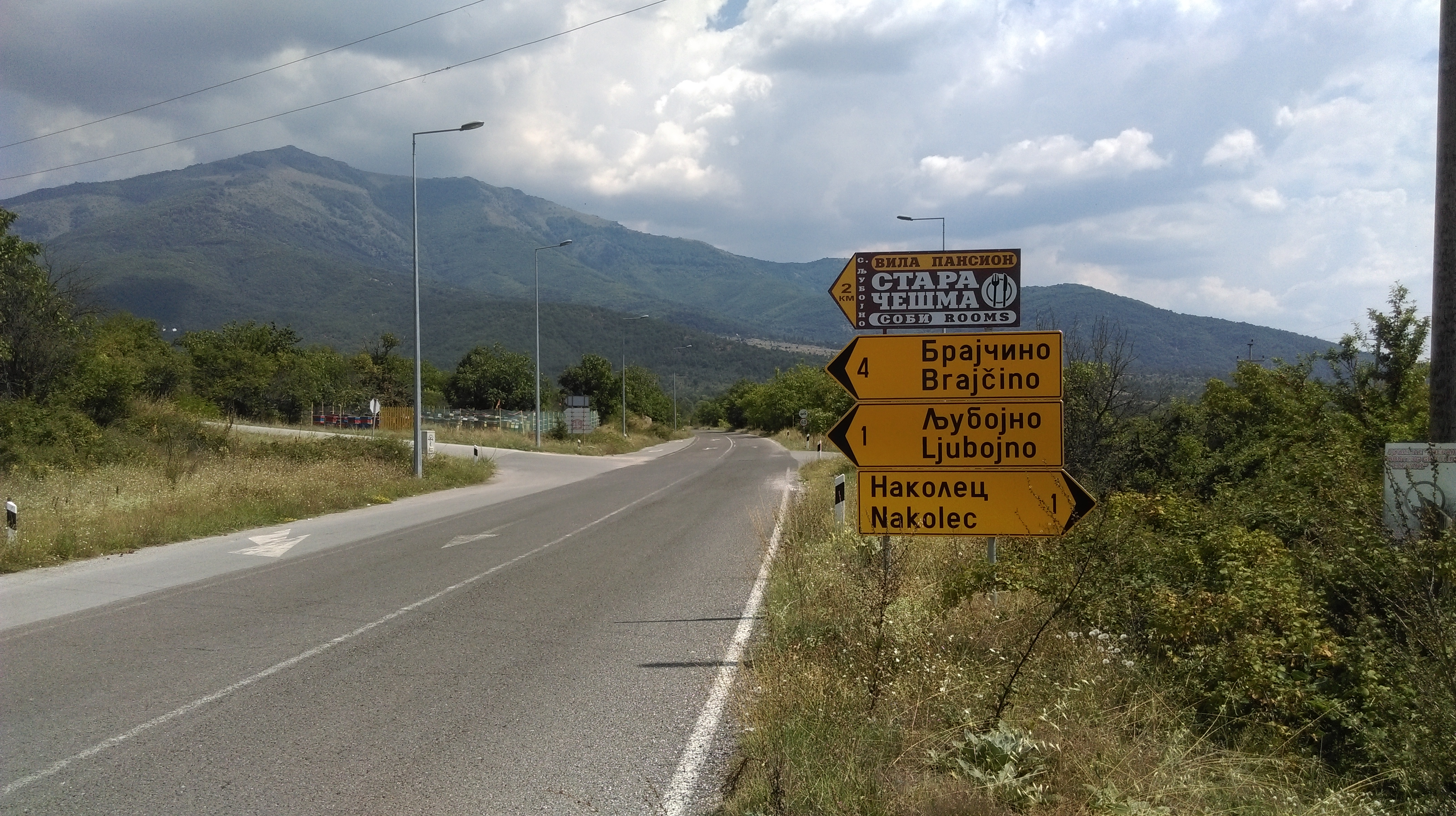
Entrance (right) into Nakolec from main road

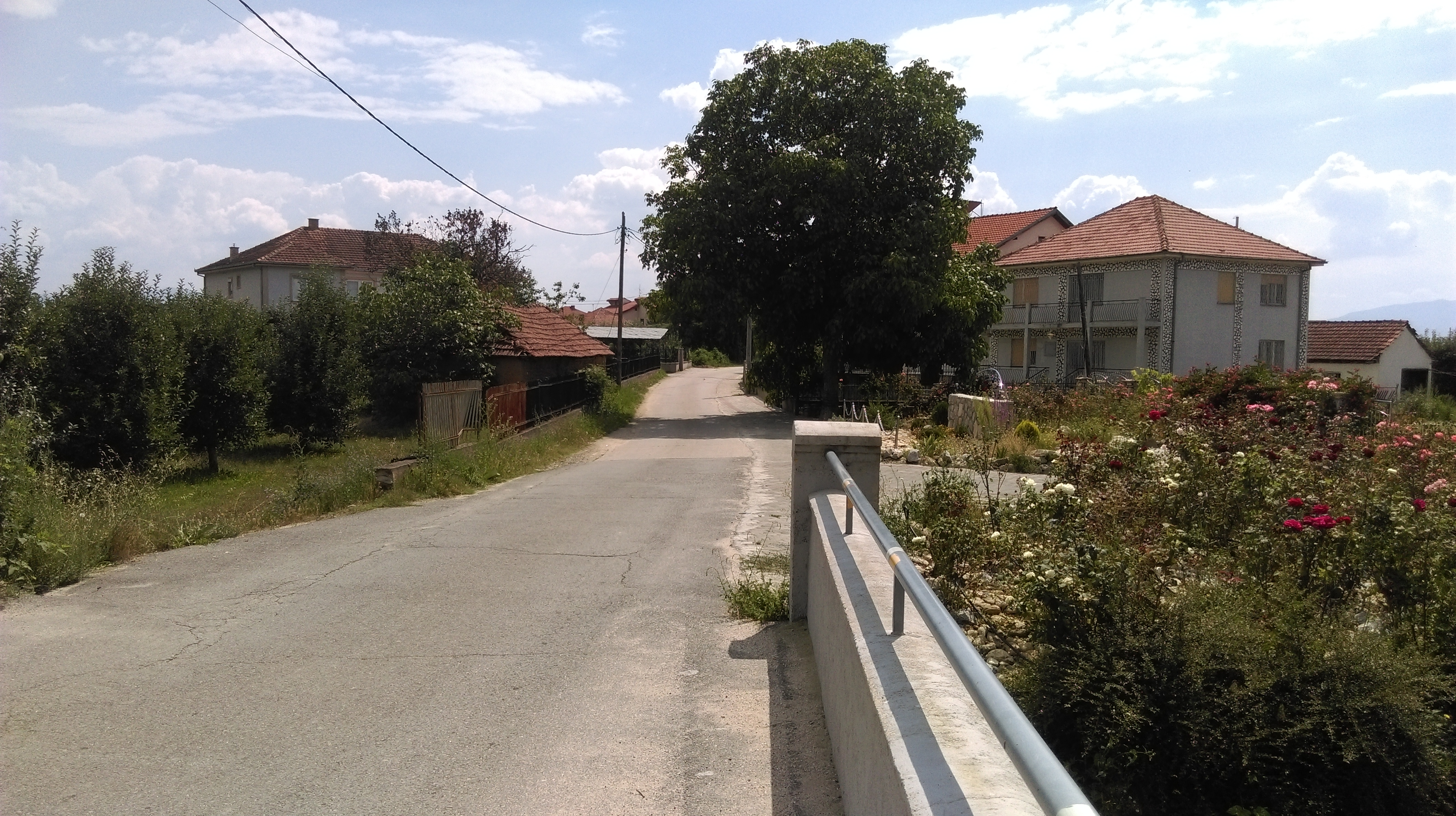
Architecture of Nakolec

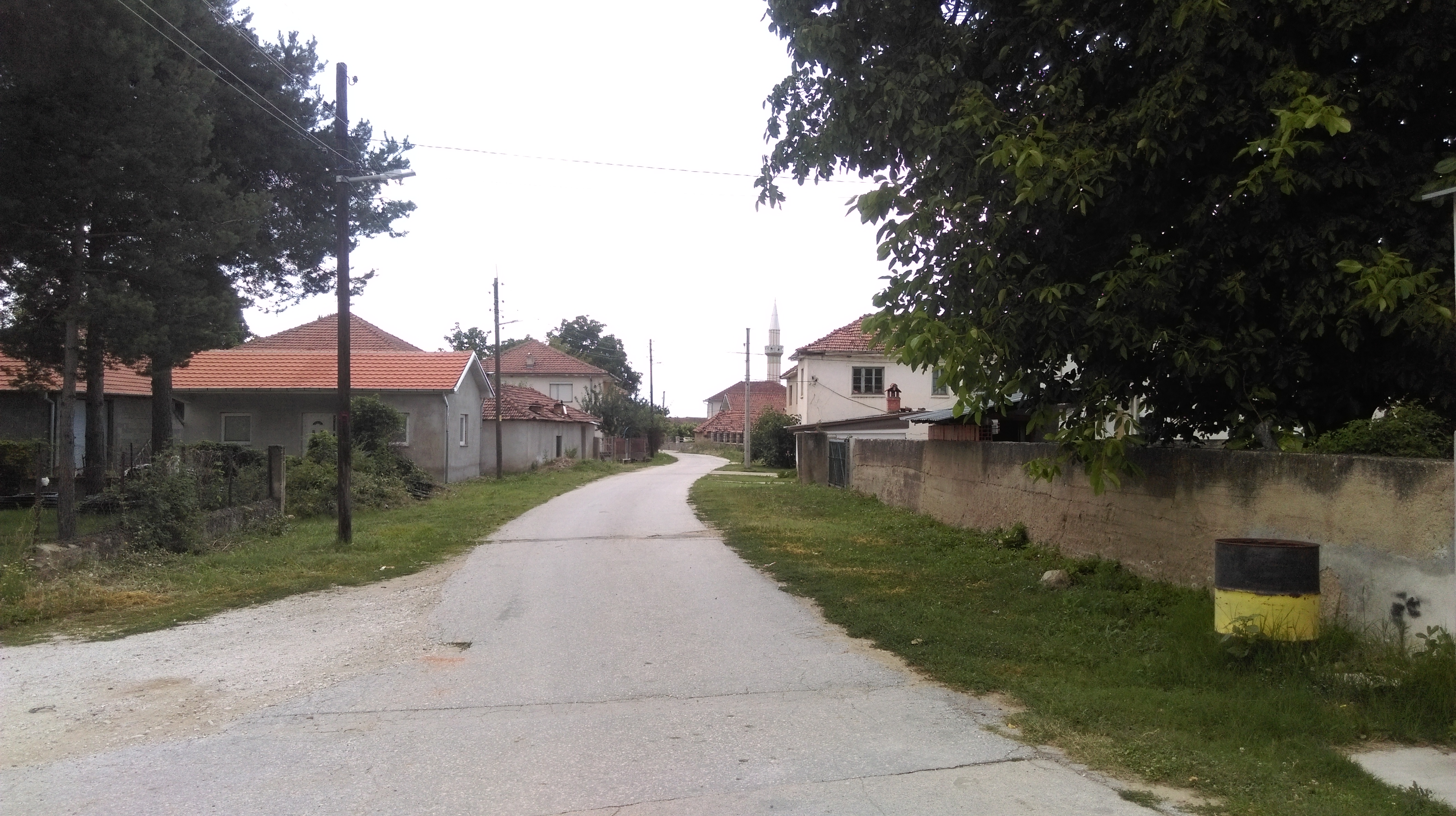
Architecture of Nakolec

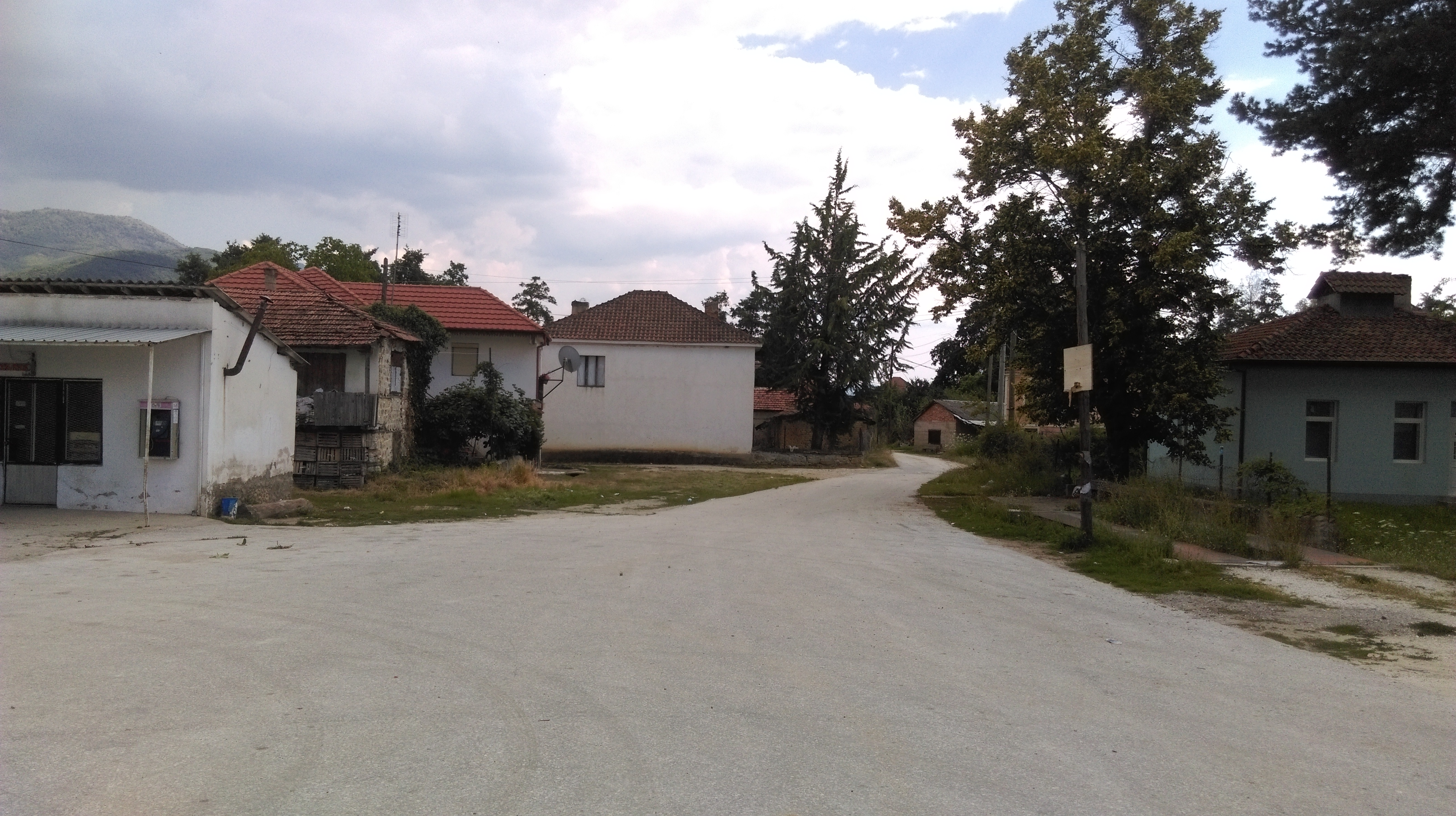
Nakolec village square

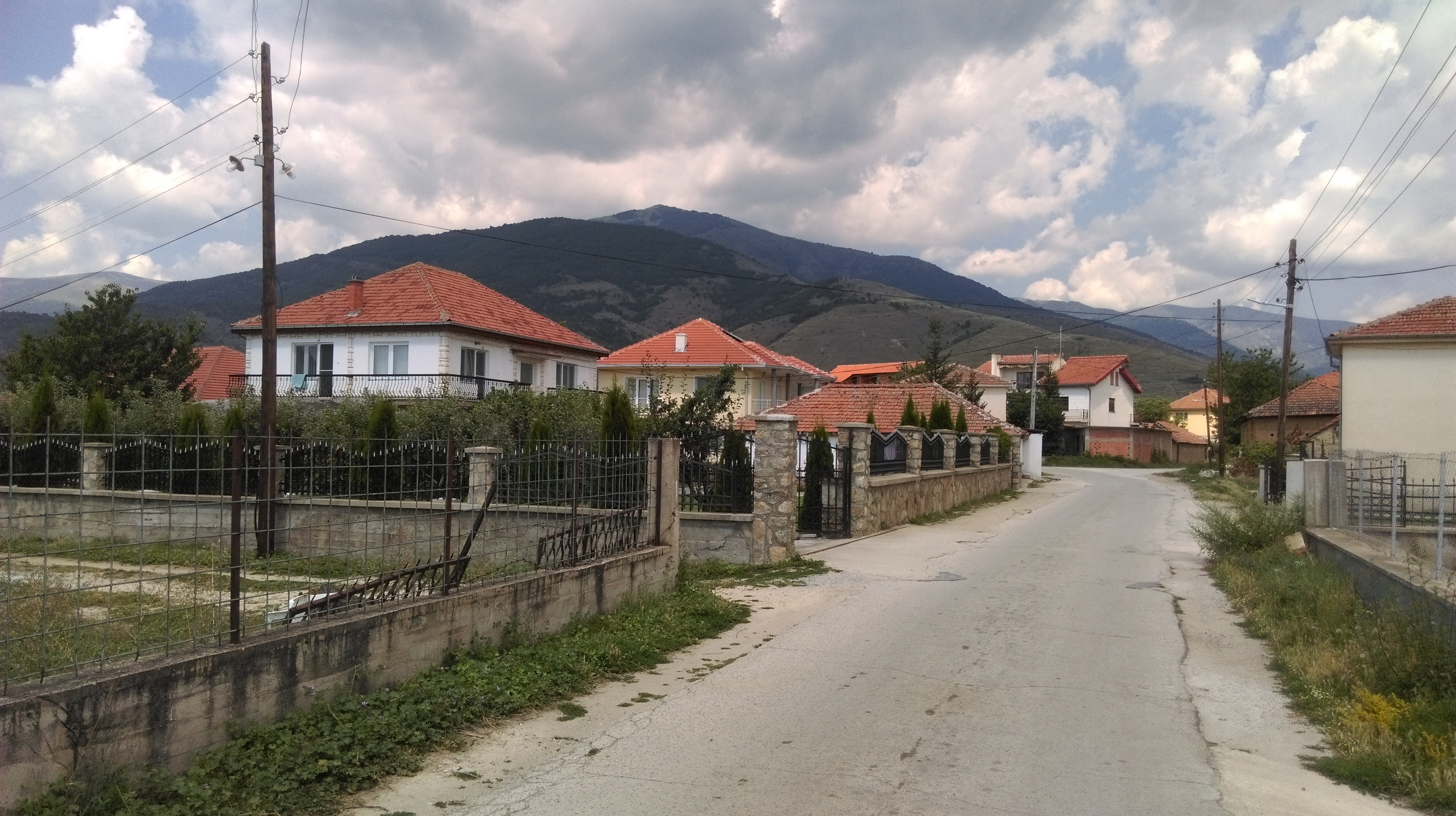
Architecture of Nakolec

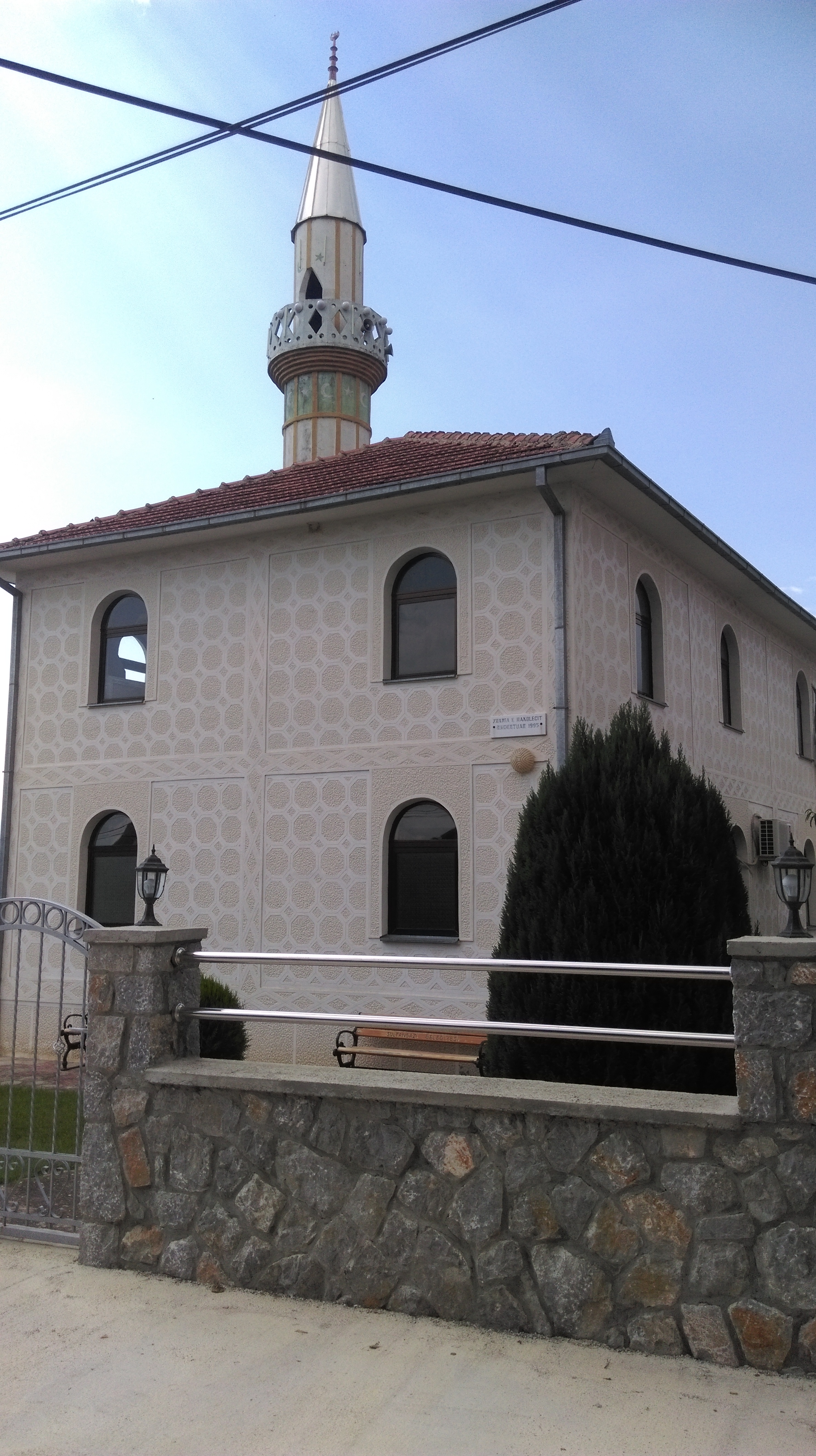
Mosque of Nakolec

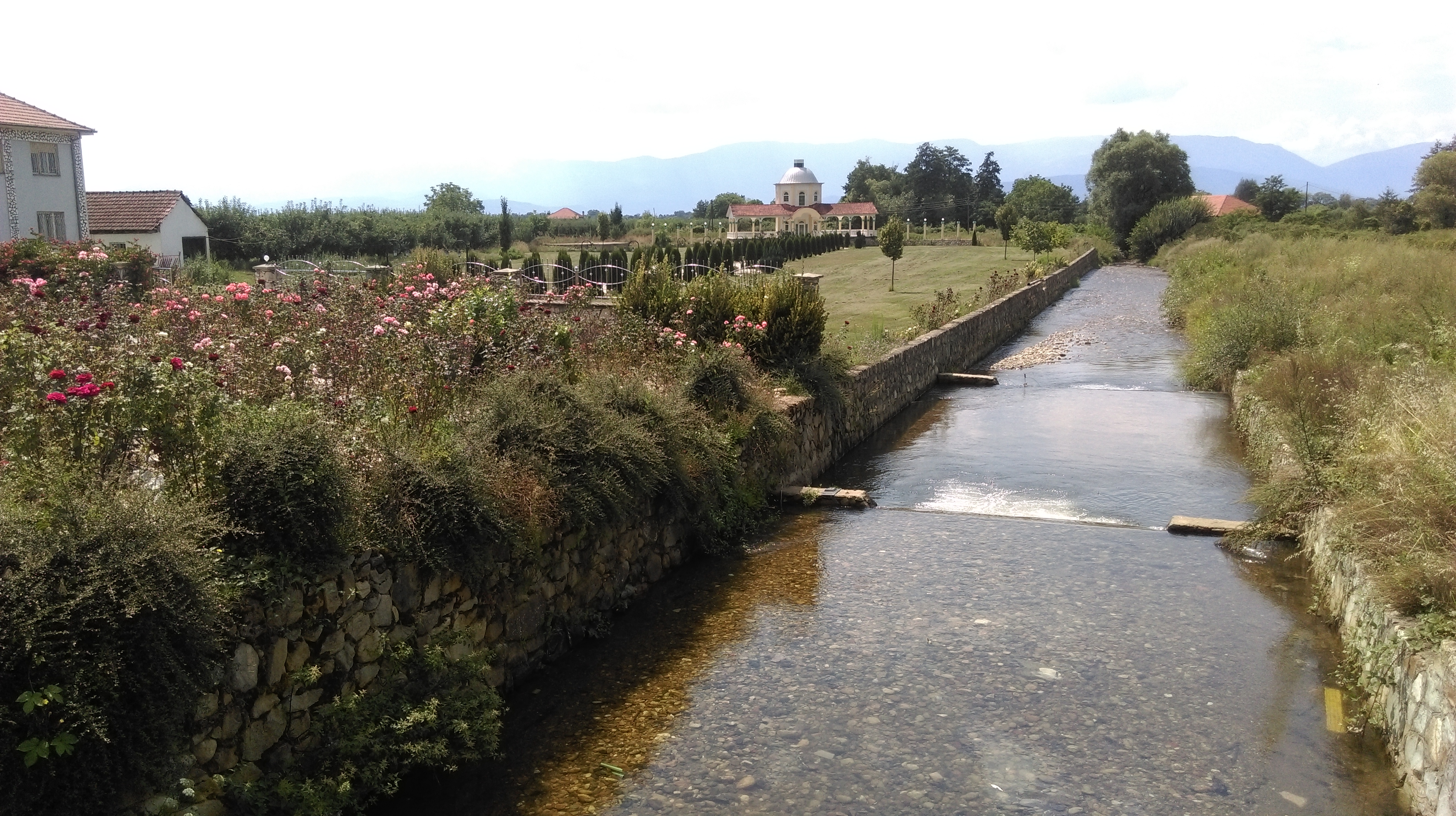
River of Nakolec and Sufi shrine (centre) in the background

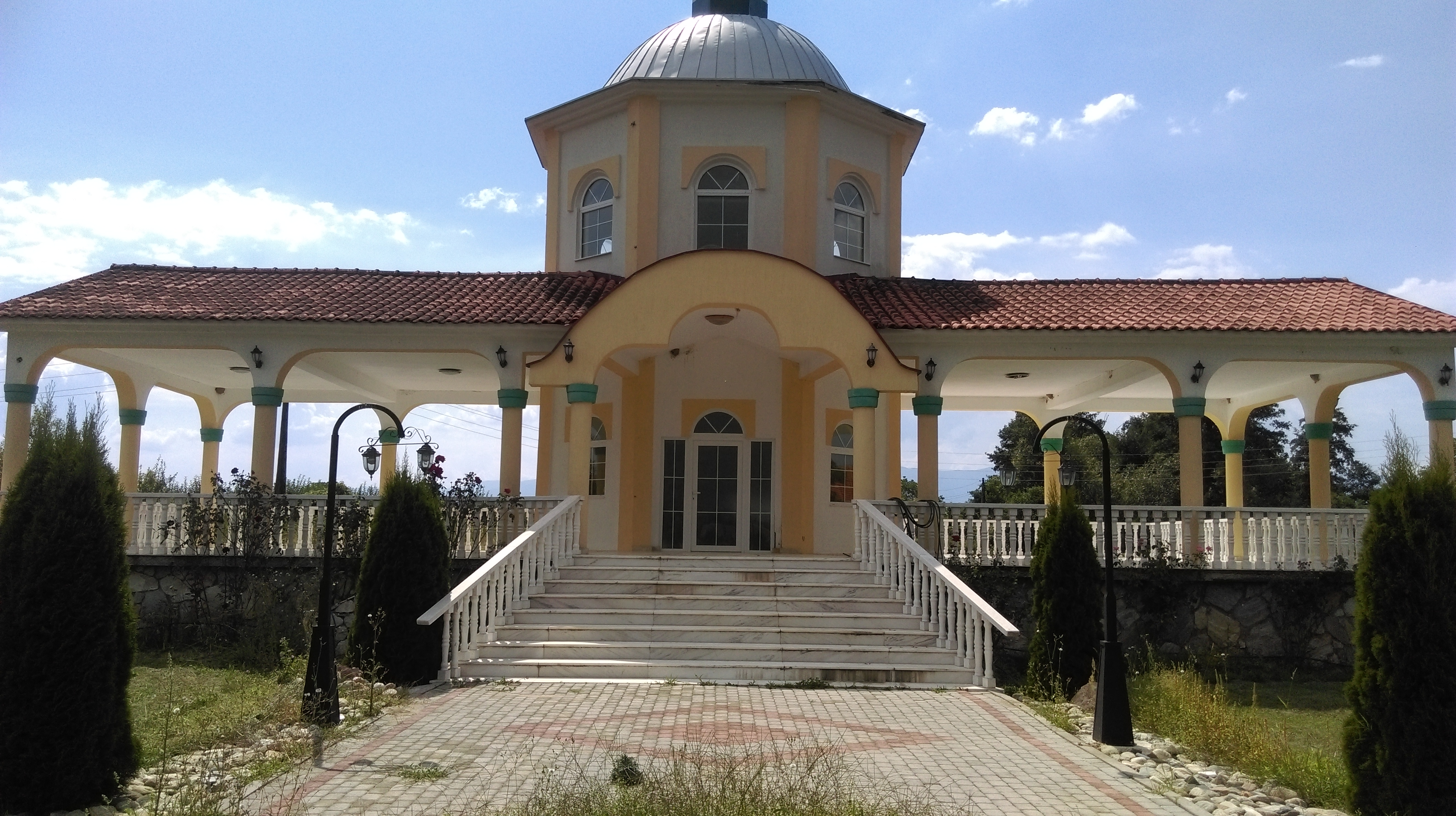
Sufi Muslim shrine in Nakolec

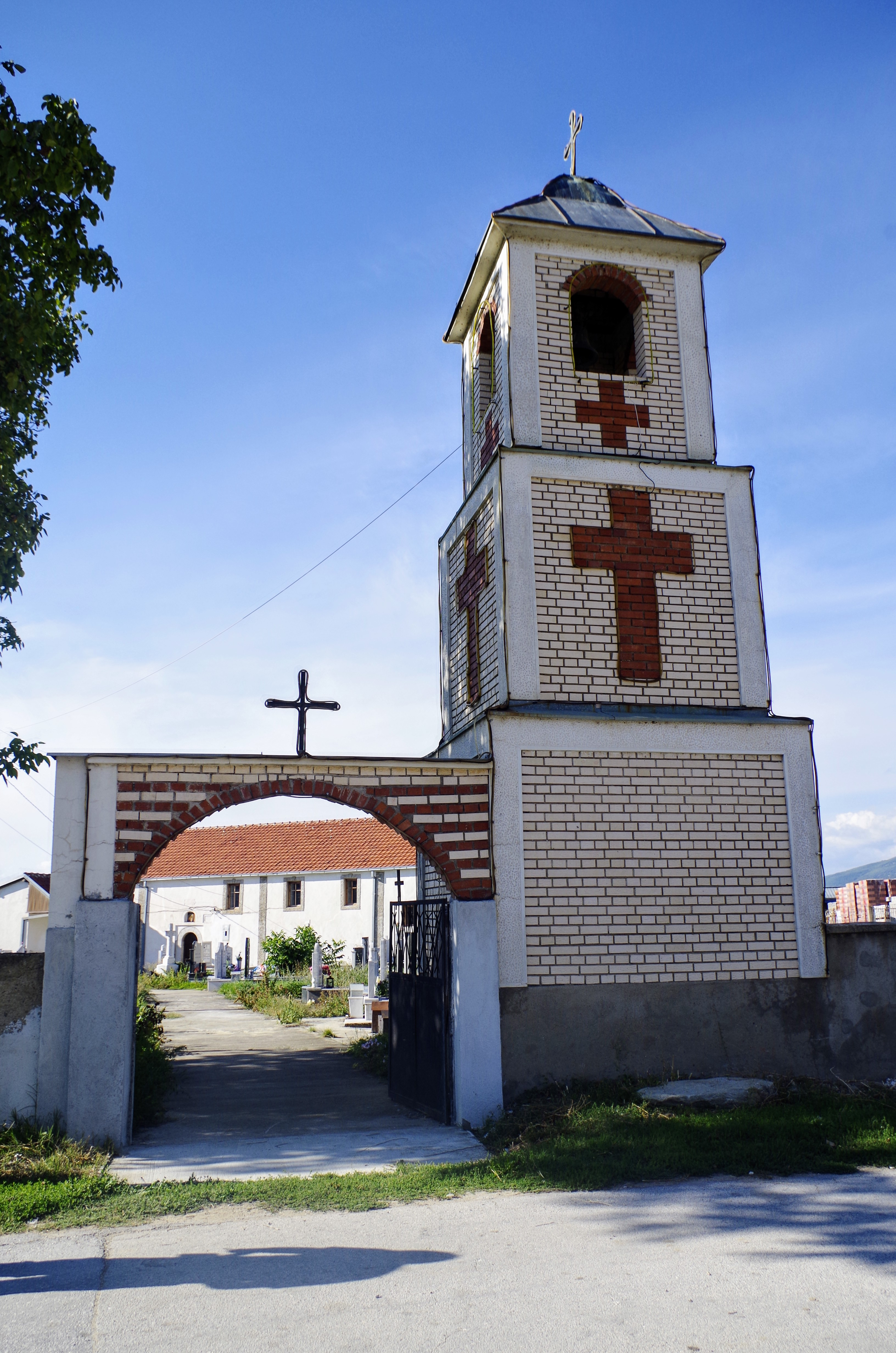
Orthodox church entrance and bell tower of Nakolec

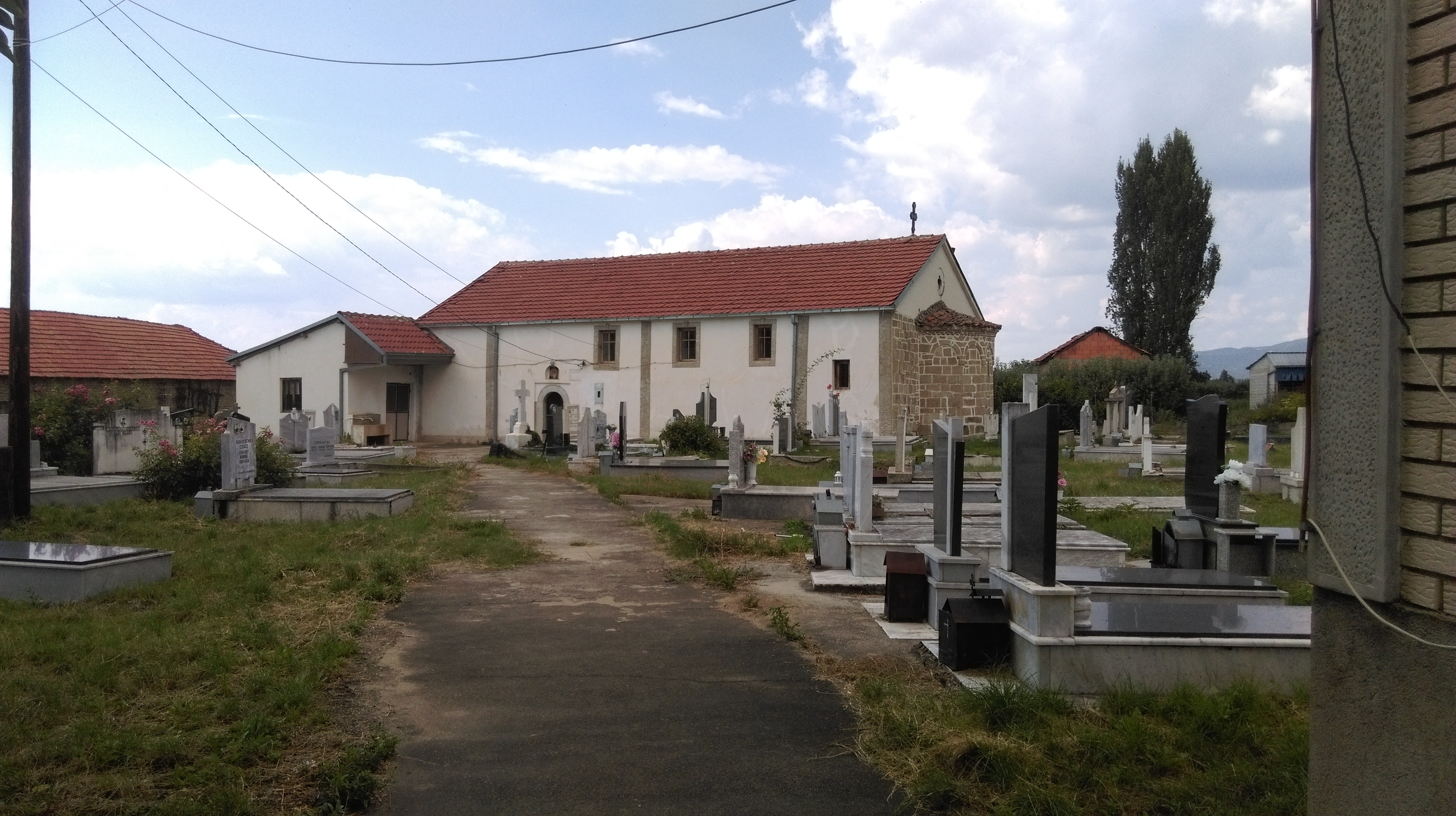
Orthodox church and cemetery of Nakolec

== People from Nakolec ==
- Risto Vasilevski (1943 -), poet, critic, and translator
