= Resen, North Macedonia =

Resen Ресен (Macedonian)
- Town
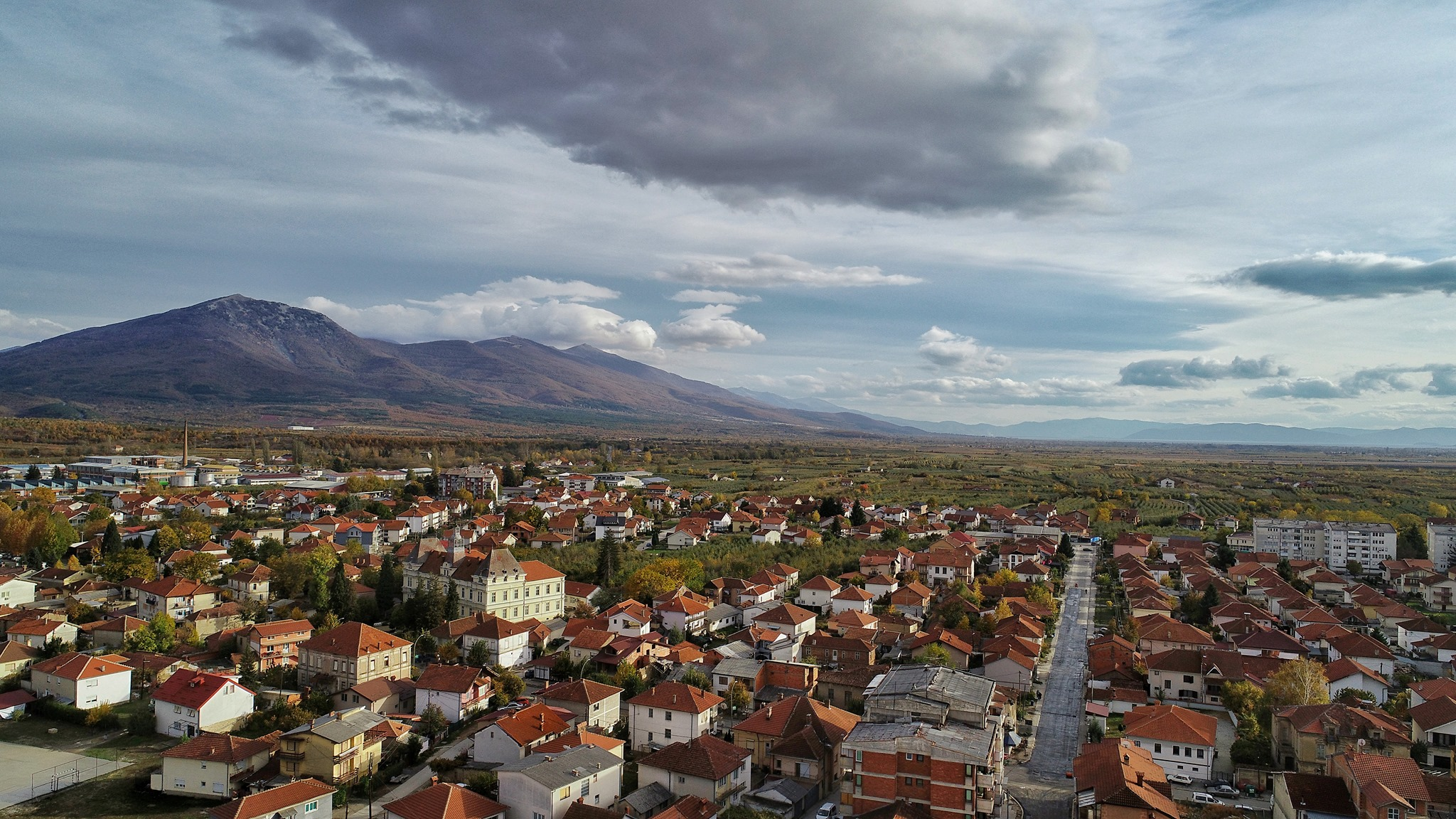
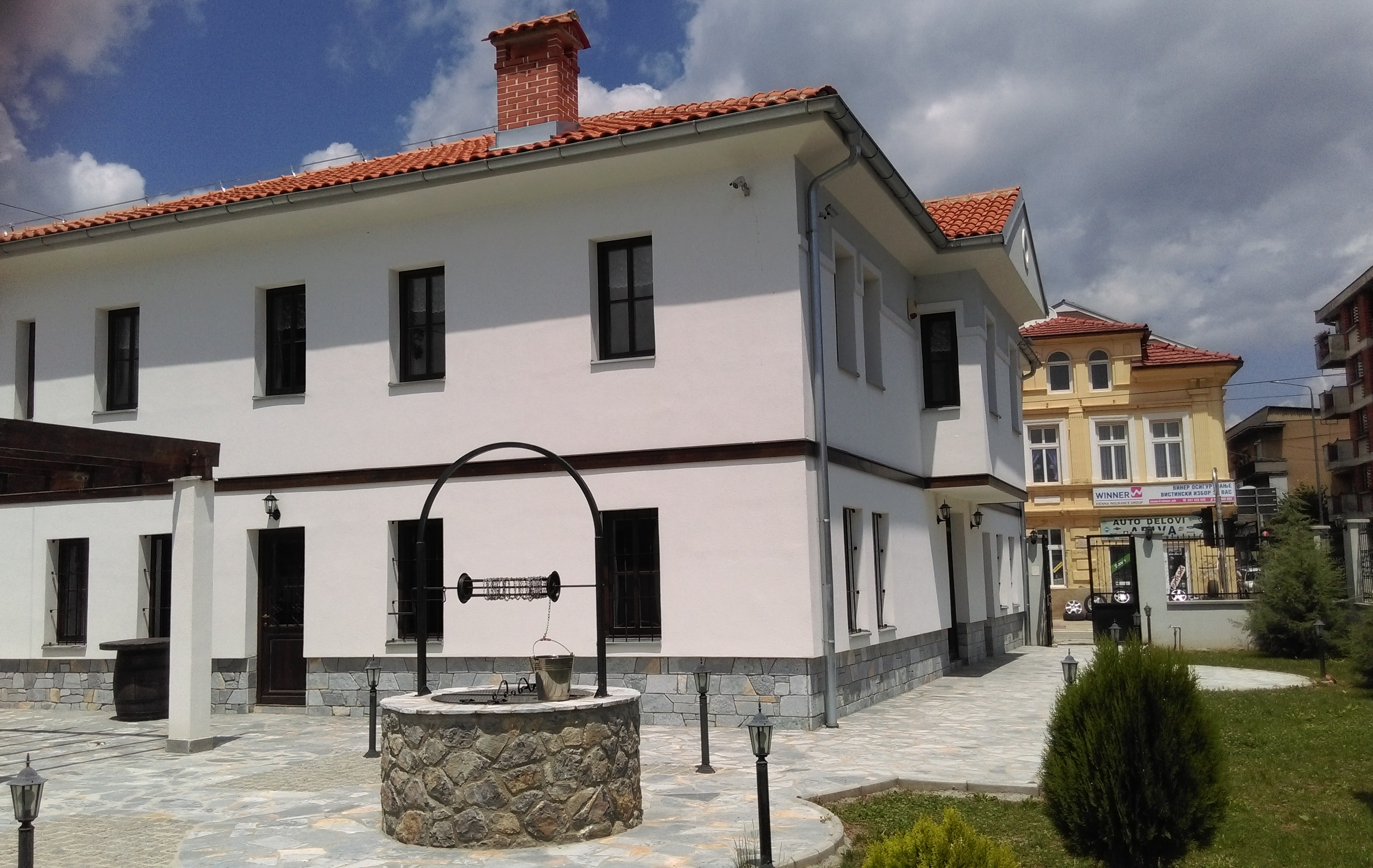
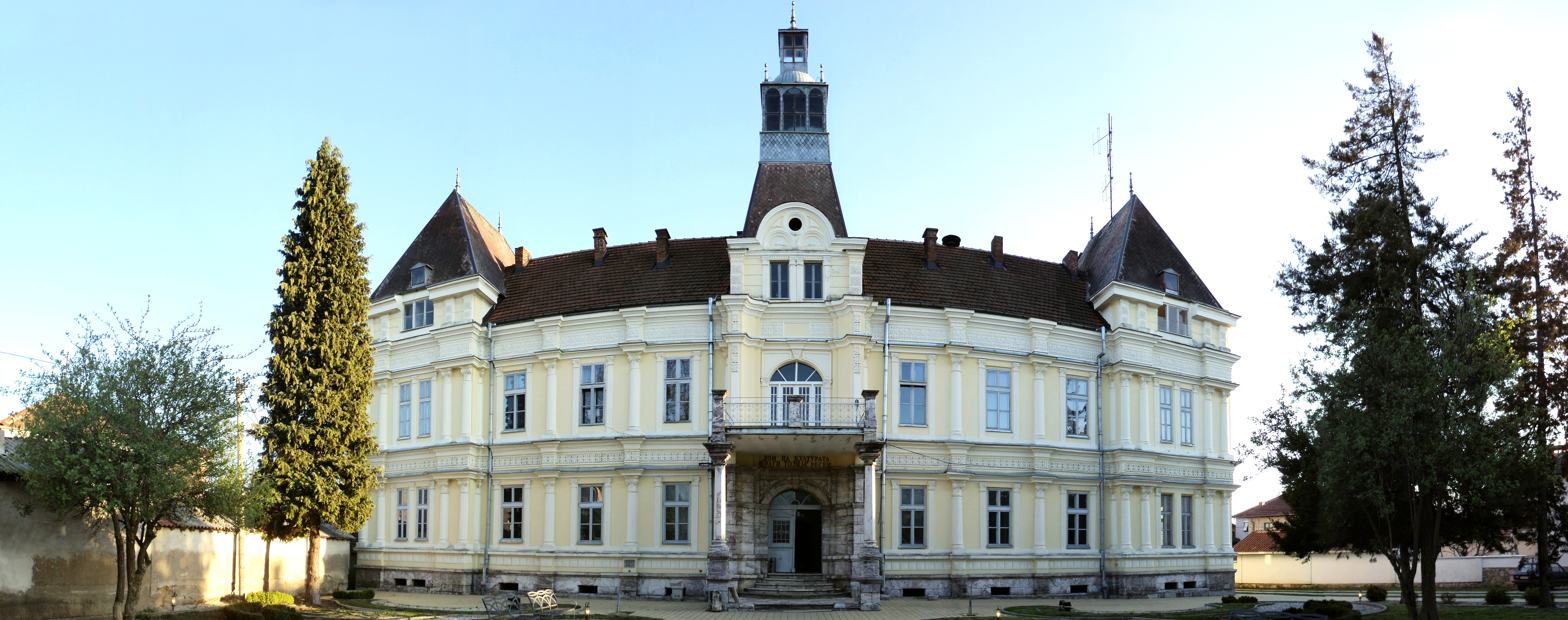
- From the top, View of Resen, Hristo Tatarčev Memorial House, Saraj Estate

- Flag Seal

- Location within North Macedonia
- Coordinates: 41°05′20″N 21°00′44″E
- Country: North Macedonia
- Region: Pelagonia
- Municipality: Resen

Government
  - Mayor: Jovan Tozievski (VMRO-DPMNE)
- Elevation: 885 m (2,904 ft)

Population (2002)
  - Total: 8,748
- Time zone: UTC+1 (CET)
  - Summer (DST): UTC+2 (CEST)
- Postal code: 7310
- Area code: +389
- Vehicle registration: RE
- Climate: Cfb
- Website: https://resen.gov.mk/

Resen (Macedonian: Ресен [ˈrɛsɛn]) is a town in southwestern North Macedonia, with just under 9,000 inhabitants. Resen is approximately equidistant between Bitola and Ohrid. The town rises 880 metres (2,887 feet) above sea level and is situated near Lake Prespa. Resen is the only town in the Prespa Lake area and is the seat of Resen Municipality.

== Name ==
The name of the city in Macedonian is Resen (Ресен) and in Turkish Resne, while in Albanian it is known as Resnjë (definite form: Resnja). In Aromanian, it is Areshanj and in Greek Resinion, Ρησίνιον.

== History ==
The ancient Illyrian city of Damastion (Δαμάστιον in Greek) may be near Resen. Resen's history dates to the Roman Empire when the famous road Via Egnatia was built, passing through the city.

During the Middle Ages, the Prespa area was part of the Bulgarian empire under Samuil. After the Battle of Klyuch, some of Samuil's soldiers, who were each blinded in one eye, settled in a village on the shore of Lake Prespa. The Byzantines called the village Asamati. The Byzantine meaning of this word is "settlement of one-eyed people". From then on, Resen was under Byzantine rule.

Later, Resen became part of the Second Bulgarian Empire, Serbian Empire and Ottoman Empire, and it was the birthplace of Ahmed Niyazi Bey, an Albanian officer from a noble family of the town, who was one of the initiators and leaders of the Young Turk Revolution in the region in 1908. Ahmed Niyazi Bey's most famous monument in Resen is the Saraj, a French-style estate he built. In the late 19th and early 20th century, Resen was part of the Manastir Vilayet of the Ottoman Empire. During this time, Aromanians were the second most numerous group in Resen after Macedonians.

From 1929 to 1941, Resen was part of the Vardar Banovina of the Kingdom of Yugoslavia.

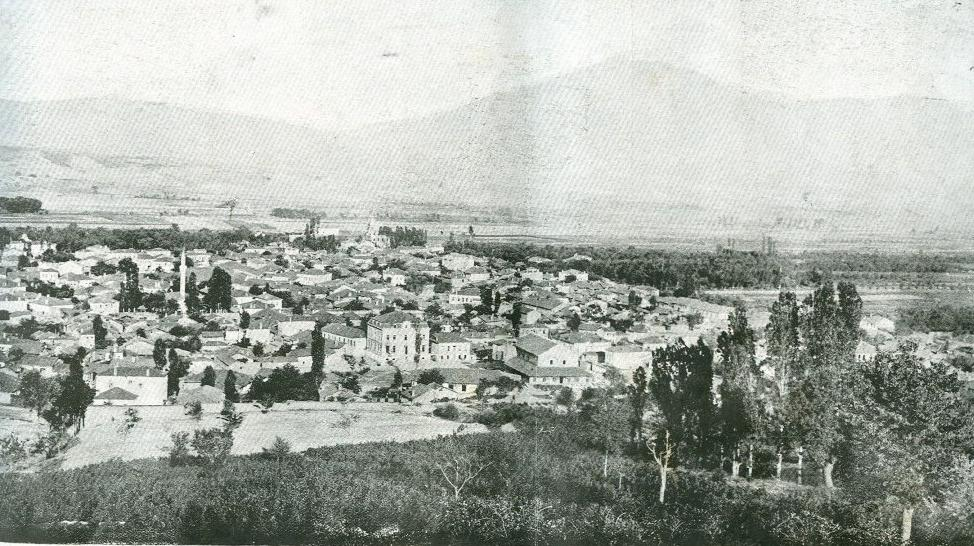
Resen in the early 20th century

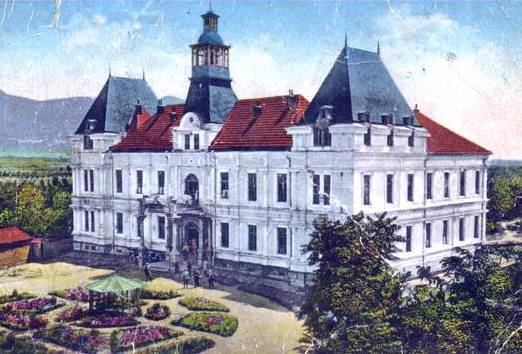
Old picture of the Saraj

== Demographics ==
In the late Ottoman period, according to N. Th. Shinas (1886), Resen had a total population of 5,530 divided by 3,300 Muslims and 3,300 Christians. According to Spiridon Gopčević (1889), Resen (5,200) had 2,150 Muslims, 2,400 Christians, 500 Romani, 660 Aromanians and 700 Muslim Serbs. Vasil Kanchov (1900) in his statistics had listed Resen (4,450) as composed of 2,400 Bulgarian Christians, 800 Bulgarian Muslims, 350 Romani, 300 Muslim Albanians, 570 Aromanians and 30 Turks. According to the statistics of Dimitri Mishev (D. M. Brancoff), the town had a total Christian population of 4,388 in 1905, consisting of 2,096 Exarchist Bulgarians, 1,296 Patriarchist Bulgarians, 696 Christian Albanians and 300 Vlachs. The town also had 5 schools, of which 2 were Bulgarian, 2 Greek and 1 Vlach. According to A. Arvanitis, in Resen (7,500) there were 2,500 Turks, 2,000 Bulgarians and 3,000 Greeks. According to K. Andreadis (1910), the population of Resen was 5,000-6,000 consisting of 1,700-2,000 Muslims and 3,300-4,000 Christians with Bulgarians being the majority demographic element and some Greeks. According to Ath. Haliopoulos (1910), Resen (4,990) was composed of 2,200 Muslims, 1,700 Bulgarians, 1.000 Aromanians, 60 Romanians and 30 Serbs. According to Tr. Evangelidis (1913), Resen (7,500) had 3,750 Greeks.

As of the 2002 census, the town of Resen has 8,748 inhabitants and the ethnic composition was the following:

- Macedonians, 6,431 (73.5%)
- Turks, 1,369 (15.7%)
- Albanians, 325 (3.7%)
- others, 623 (7.1%)

The mother tongues of the city's residents include the following:

- Macedonian, 6,574 (75.2%)
- Turkish, 1,355 (15.5%)
- Albanian, 629 (7.2%)
- others, 190 (2.2%)

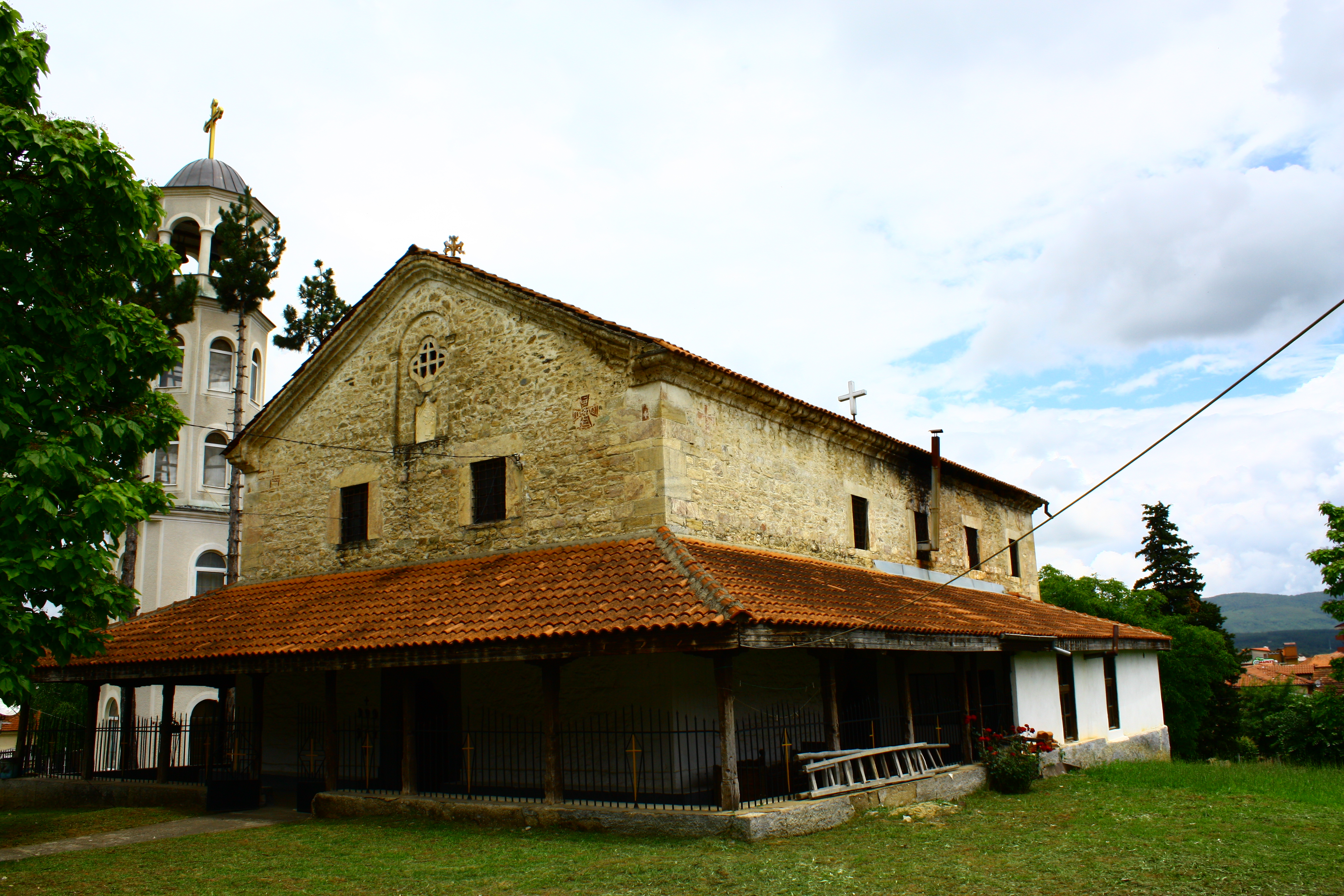
St. George Church in Resen

The religious composition of the city was the following:

- Orthodox Christians, 6,382 (73.0%)
- Muslims, 2,272 (26.0%)
- others, 94 (1.0%)

A sizable amount of the Macedonian population originates from the nearby villages of Podmočani, Bolno, Malovišta in addition to other villages from the Lake Ohrid area who settled in Resen during the middle of the 19th century. The Albanian population settled in Resen during first decades of the 19th century originating from the Yanya vilayet. In contemporary times Muslim Albanians live in small numbers within Resen. In the latter decades of the 20th century, some Albanian-speaking Muslim Romani from the villages of Krani and Nakolec have migrated to Resen. Most of the Muslim population living in Resen speaks Turkish and are either descended from Turks settled in strategic areas or the descendants of local Turkified Slavs during Ottoman rule. A small population of Orthodox Aromanians also lives in Resen.

== Climate ==
Resen has a mild continental climate with cold winters and warm summers, which makes it a tourist attraction, especially in summer. The climate and the quality of soil are key factors for Prespa's region to have a long tradition of agriculture. One of the most important landmarks of Resen's today are the apple orchards, well known for the quality and specific taste of apples.

== Culture ==
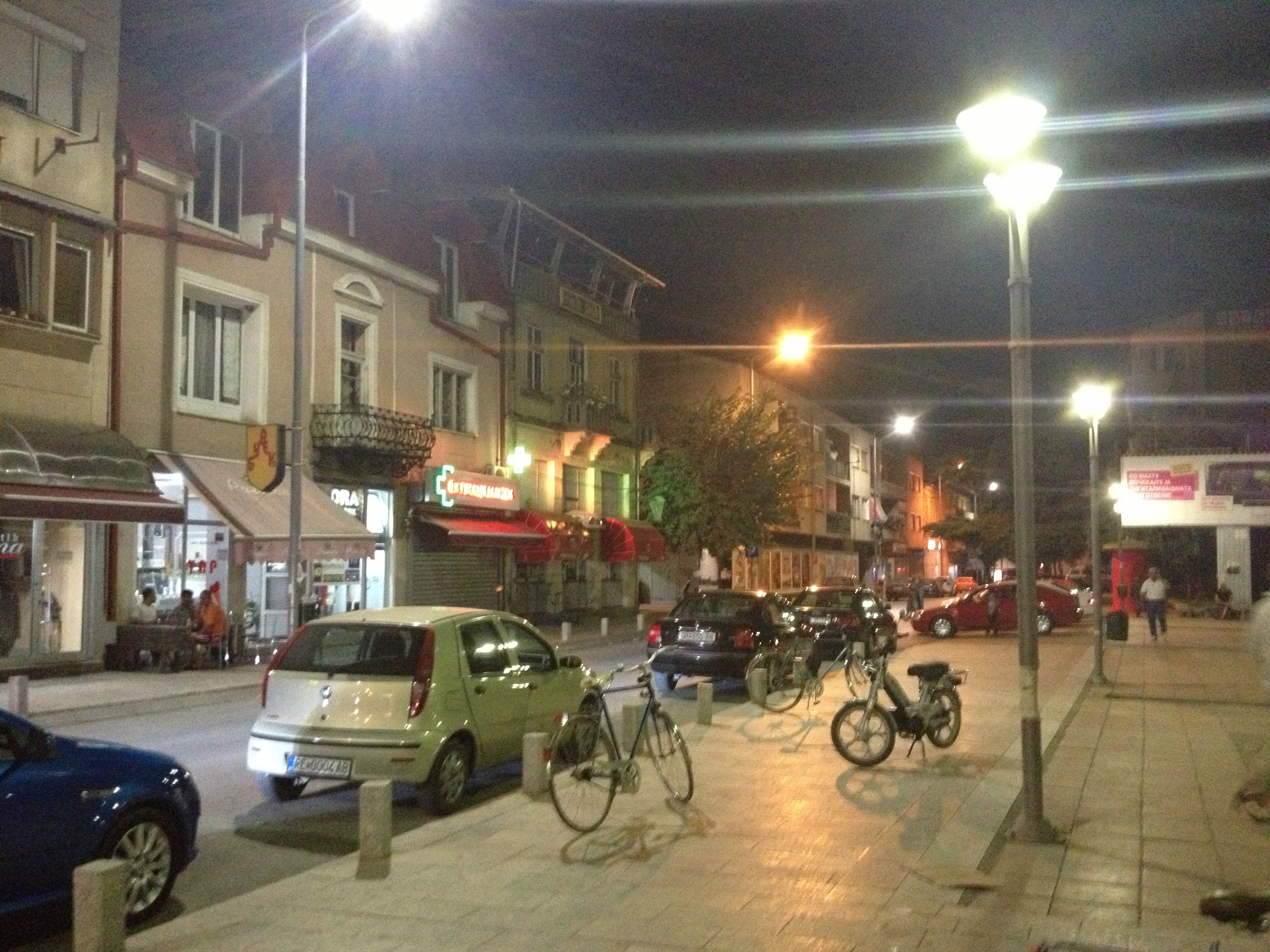
Resen in the evening

Resen is home to Prespa's Ceramic Colony, established in the 1970s, which attracts renowned artists from all over the world. The organization is included in the UNESCO International Academy of Ceramics. It is housed in the Saraj, which also houses the Dragi Tozija House of Culture, the Keraca Visulčeva Gallery, and a library.

=== Sports ===
Local football club FK Prespa plays in the Macedonian Third League (Southwest Division) and FK Jildirimspor plays in the 4th tier OFL Resen.
