= Saraj (Resen) =

- Сарај
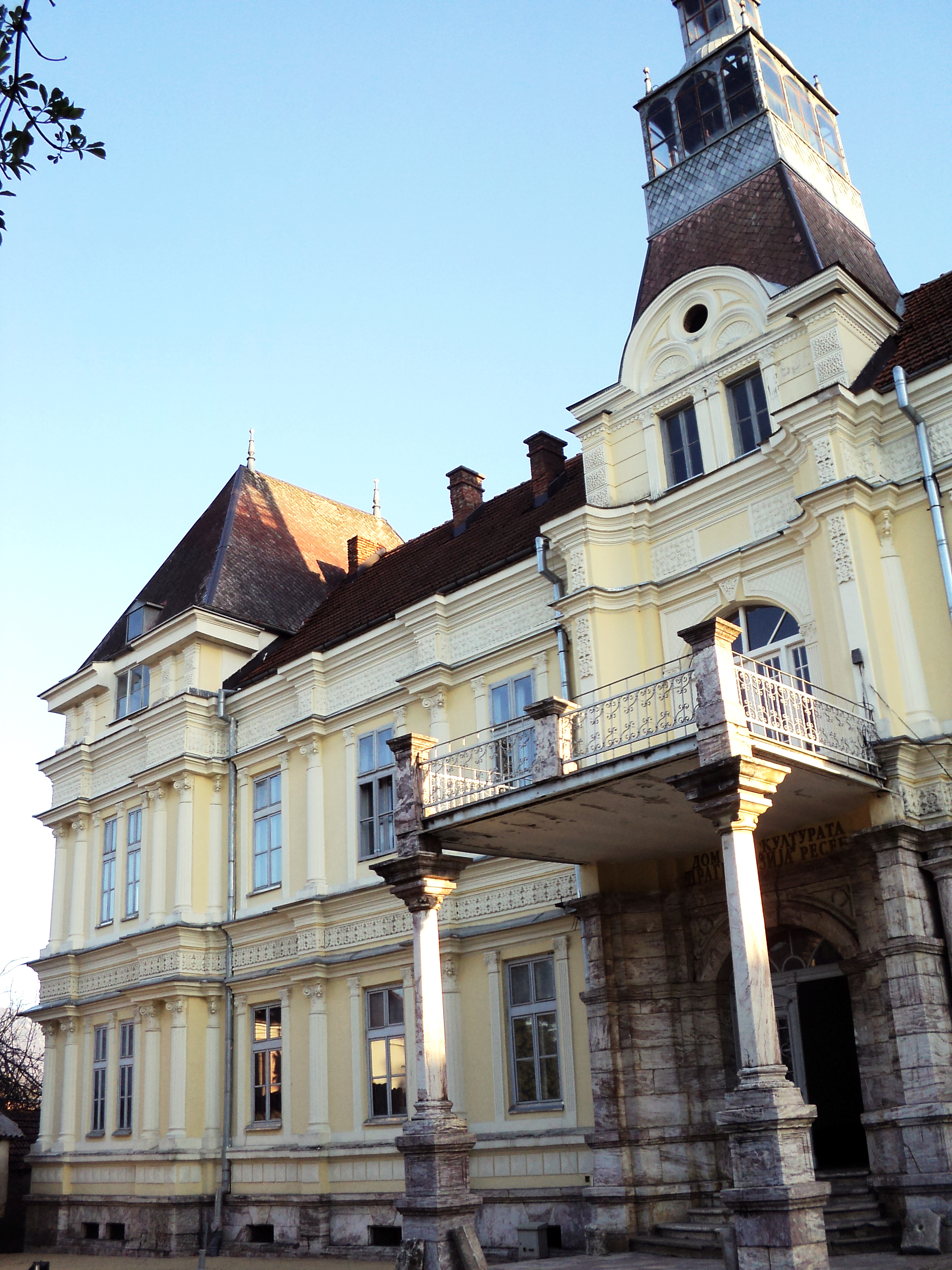

- Location within North Macedonia

General information
- Architectural style: Neoclassical
- Location: Resen, North Macedonia
- Coordinates: 41°05′18″N 21°00′58″E
- Current tenants: Dragi Tozija House of Culture; Resen Ceramic Colony; Keraca Visulčeva Gallery; Library
- Groundbreaking: 1895
- Completed: 1899
- Renovated: 1982, 2005

Height
- Height: 35 m (115 ft)

Technical details
- Floor area: 7,800 m^{2} (83,958 ft^{2})

Website
- Official website

The Saraj (Macedonian: Сарај) is a historic Neoclassical estate in Resen, North Macedonia. It was built in the late 19th century by the bey of Resen, Ahmed Niyazi Bey. The Saraj's architectural style makes it unique in North Macedonia.

The name "Saraj" comes from the Turkish word saray meaning "palace". The building is now home to a museum, a ceramic colony, a gallery, and a library. The local population of Resen municipality refers to the building as "Saraj".

== Description ==
The Saraj was built in the neoclassical architectural style. The building is symmetrical with a taller central portion, which rises 35 m (114 ft), and two wings. It has a basement, a main floor, a second floor, and an attic, and has a floor area of 7,800 m^{2} (83,958 ft^{2}).

The building's exterior walls are 60 cm (2.0 ft) to 105 cm (3.44 ft) thick. They contain rich sculptural detail, particularly on the façade. The roof was originally made of wood but, during renovation in 1982, it was replaced with steel profiles.

== History ==
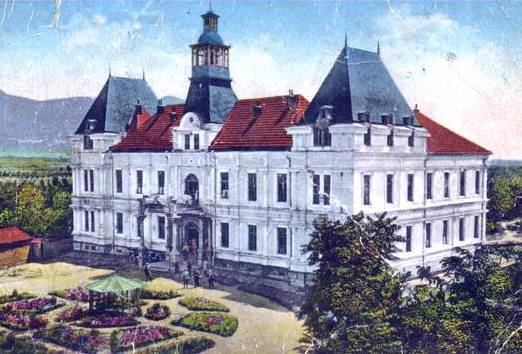
The Saraj in the early 1900s

Ahmed Niyazi Bey, a progressive and likely a member of the Young Turk Revolution, was the bey of the Resen area in the late 19th and early 20th centuries. The bey desired to have a French-style estate, perhaps after receiving a postcard of Versailles.

Construction of the Saraj began in 1905 and the exterior of the building was completed in 1909 after the Young Turk Revolution. Everything else, including the interior, was not completed until a few years after the Balkan Wars and World War I in 1922. Ahmed Niyazi Bey, however, died in 1912 in Durrës of unknown causes and therefore never lived to see his estate completed.

After the Balkan Wars, the Saraj served several different functions for several different organisations. It was first used for local administrative purposes under the Kingdom of Serbia, then under the Kingdom of Yugoslavia. During World War II, the building was used by occupying forces. After the war, it was used as the city hall of Resen and, later, as a city library. Finally, the Saraj became a museum and gallery, which it remains today.

The building's roof has been restored twice since its construction: once in 1982 and again in 2005.

=== Current use ===
The Saraj today houses the Dragi Tozija House of Culture, the Resen Ceramic Colony, the Keraca Visulčeva Gallery, and a library.

The Dragi Tozija House of Culture is a branch of the Museum of Macedonia in Skopje. The house of culture is also home to plays, literary readings, and other cultural events.

The Resen Ceramic Colony, also situated in the Saraj, is a member of the International Academy of Ceramics of UNESCO.

A permanent gallery containing many of the works of painter Keraca Visulčeva is also found in the building.

A city library has existed in the Saraj since the 1940s. Today, it contains over 31,000 books.

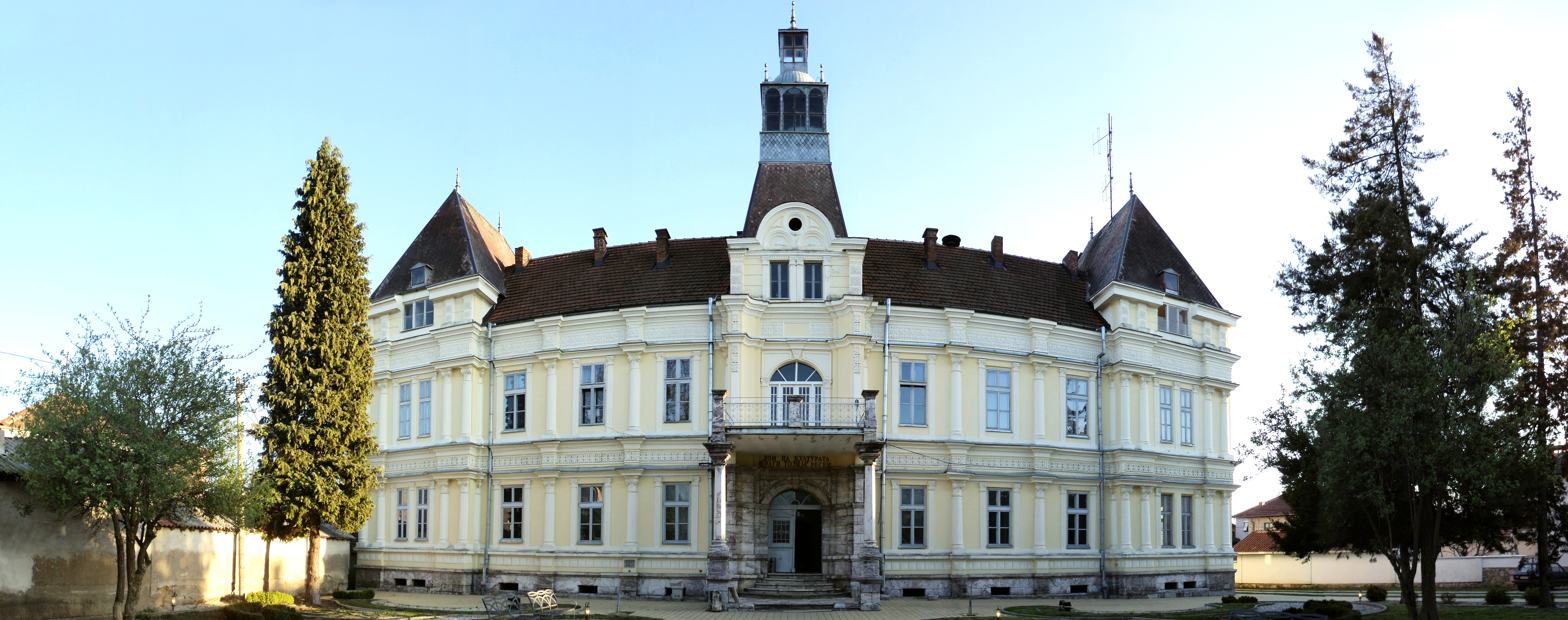
Panorama of the Saraj
