= Keraca Visulčeva =

Keraca Visulčeva Кераца Висулчева
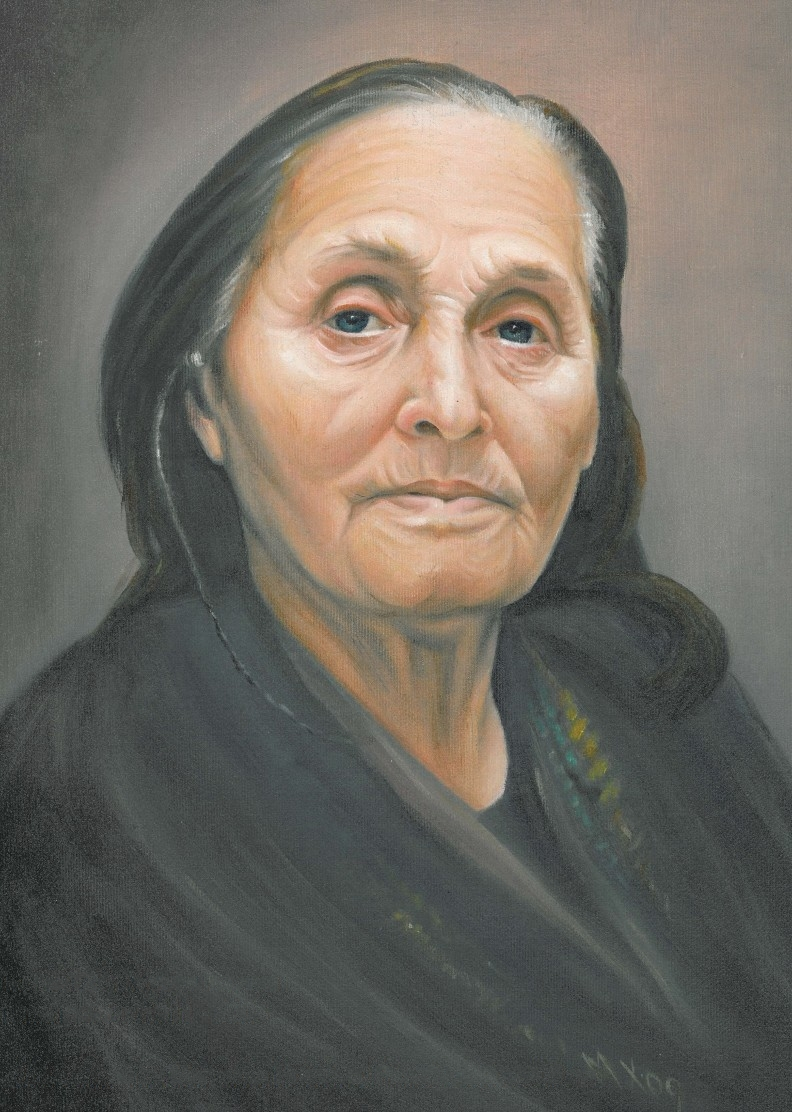
- (Margarita Hristova, 2009)
- Born: 7 April 1911; Nestram, Manastir Vilayet, Ottoman Empire, today Nestorio, Greece
- Died: 13 January 2004 (aged 92); Skopje, Republic of Macedonia
- Education: National Academy of Art, Sofia, Bulgaria, (1935)
- Known for: Fine Art, oil paintings, then sculpture
- Movement: Contemporary Art, Figurative art

Keraca Visulčeva (also transliterated as Keratsa; in Cyrillic: Кераца Висулчева), (7 April 1911–13 January 2004) was a Macedonian and Bulgarian artist who was born in Nestram, in the Manastir Vilayet of the Ottoman Empire. Her family moved to Pomorie, Bulgaria, during the Balkan wars, as many Slavic Macedonian immigrants did during the same period.

== Education and career ==
After studying under Stefan Ivanov (drawing) and Nikola Ganushev and Boris Mitov (painting), she graduated at the Sofia Fine Arts Academy.

In 1935 during her first exhibit, and the great Bulgarian artist Ivan Mrkvicka noticed her talent, and she became a member of the Union of Bulgarian Artists.

Between 1941 and 1944, during the Bulgarian rule of Macedonia, she taught at the Queen Giovanna Girls' High School in Skopje. After that she moved back to the old borders of Bulgaria, where she lived until 1996.

In 1955 she participated in the exhibition of Bulgarian contemporary art in the state art gallery in Plovdiv. However, after the political changes in 1958, she was expelled from the Union of Bulgarian Artists. From that point on she started signing her paintings with her name written with the Latin script: Keratza. In 1965 she traveled to France and participated in a few French exhibitions.

After the fall of Communism in 1989, she was readmitted to the Union of Bulgarian Artists, as a former member.

In 1996, she moved again to Skopje with the assistance of numerous intellectuals, academics, ambassadors, art historians in exchange for her donation of around 400 drawings, oil and sculptures to the newly created Republic of Macedonia.

The first solo exhibition of Museum of Macedonia in 2002. Thirty-six works out of about 500 paintings were included in the collection. The exhibition was opened by Macedonian artist Gligor Cemerski.

== Artist style ==
Her favorite genres are landscapes and portraits, the most impressive segments of her work were dominated by realism or impressionist manner.

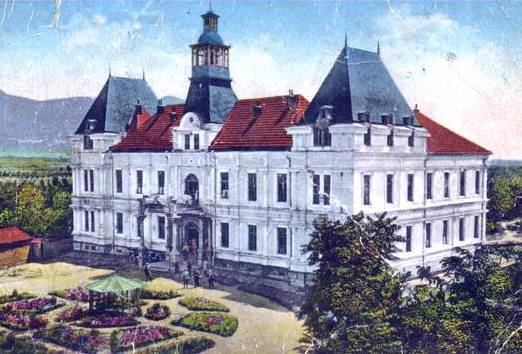
The Resen of Ahmed Niyazi Bey in the township of Resen with Keraca's heritage
