= Lavci, Resen =

Lavci Лавци Lahça
- Village
- Location within North Macedonia
- Coordinates: 41°02′43″N 20°57′16″E
- Country: North Macedonia
- Region: Pelagonia
- Municipality: Resen

Population (2002)
  - Total: 134
- Time zone: UTC+1 (CET)
  - Summer (DST): UTC+2 (CEST)
- Area code: +389
- Car plates: RE

Lavci, Resen Municipality

Lavci (Macedonian: Лавци, Turkish: Lahça) is a village in the Resen Municipality of the Republic of North Macedonia, northwest of Lake Prespa. It has 134 residents as of the 2002 census.

== Demographics ==
The village of Lavci is inhabited by Muslim Turks and Orthodox Macedonians. Lavci is one of two settlements in Resen Municipality with a Turkish majority population, the other being Kozjak.

Ethnic group	census 1961		census 1971		census 1981		census 1991		census 1994		census 2002	
Ethnic group	Number	%	Number	%	Number	%	Number	%	Number	%	Number	%
Macedonians	121	35.7	103	33.0	97	27.1	28	13.9	28	19.3	18	13.4
Turks	217	64.0	209	67.0	241	67.3	164	81.6	113	77.9	113	84.3
others	1	0.3	0	0.0	20	5.6	9	4.5	4	2.8	3	2.2
Total	339		312		358		201		145		134	
