= Kozjak, Resen =

Kozjak Козјак Kozyak Kojzak
- Village
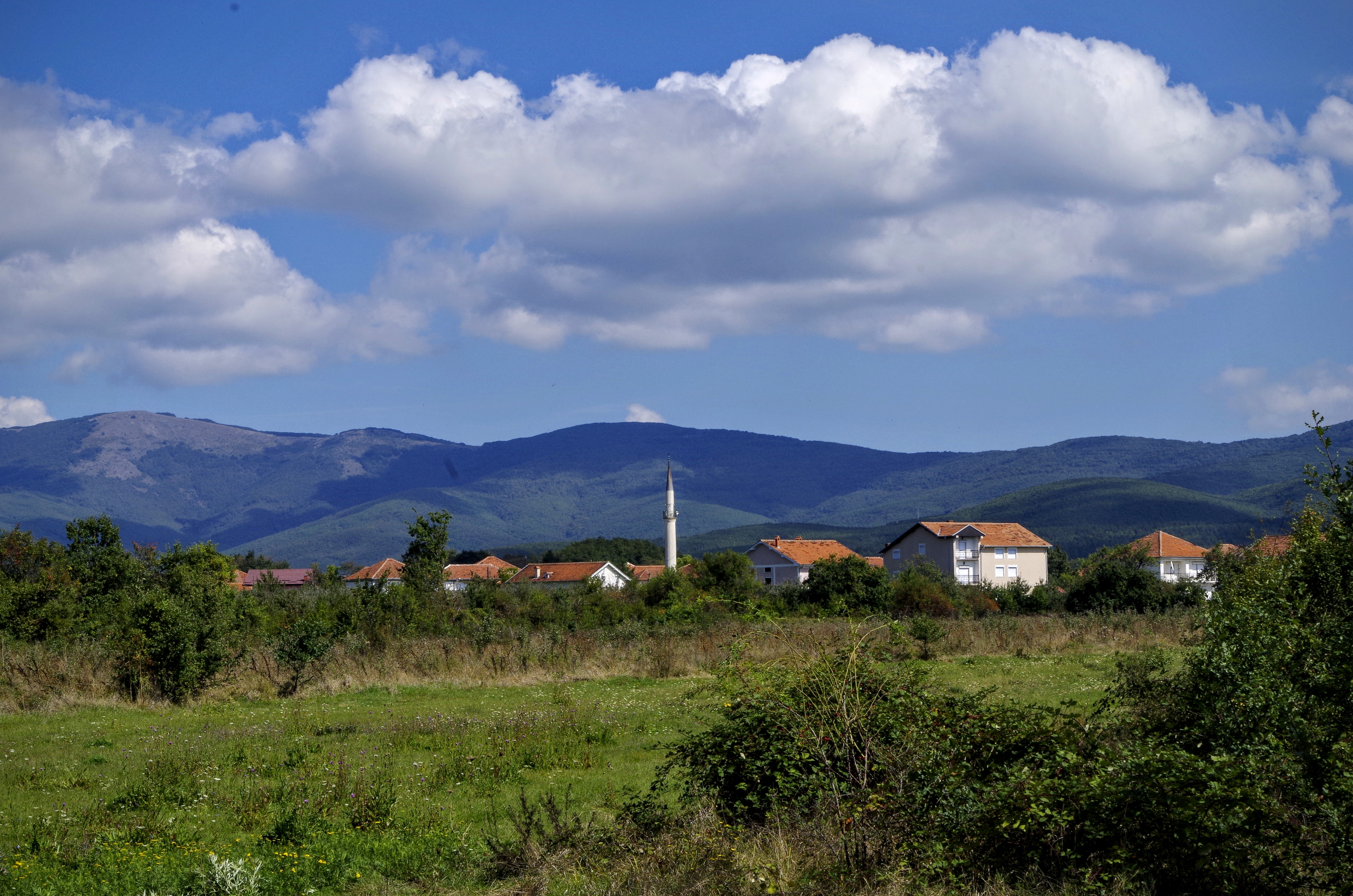
- Kozjak

- Location within North Macedonia
- Coordinates: 41°03′30″N 21°02′32″E
- Country: North Macedonia
- Region: Pelagonia
- Municipality: Resen

Population (2021)
  - Total: 85
- Time zone: UTC+1 (CET)
  - Summer (DST): UTC+2 (CEST)
- Area code: +389
- Car plates: RE

Kozjak (Macedonian: Козјак; Turkish: Kozyak; Albanian: Kojzaku) is a village in the Resen Municipality of the Republic of North Macedonia. It has 117 residents.

== Demographics ==
Kozjak is inhabited by a Turkish majority and a small number of Albanians. It is one of two villages with a Turkish majority, the other being Lavci.

Ethnic group	census 1961		census 1971		census 1981		census 1991		census 1994		census 2002		census 2021	
Ethnic group	Number	%	Number	%	Number	%	Number	%	Number	%	Number	%	Number	%
Macedonians	0	0.0	0	0.0	5	1.3	1	0.4	1	0.8	0	0.0	1	1.2
Albanians	2	0.7	10	2.8	7	1.8	8	2.9	8	6.7	11	9.4	8	9.4
Turks	297	99.3	342	96.9	337	85.1	159	57.8	111	92.5	106	90.6	74	87.1
others	0	0.0	1	0.3	47	11.9	107	38.9	0	0.0	0	0.0	0	0.0
Persons for whom data are taken from administrative sources													2	2.4
Total	299		353		396		275		120		117		85	

== Gallery ==
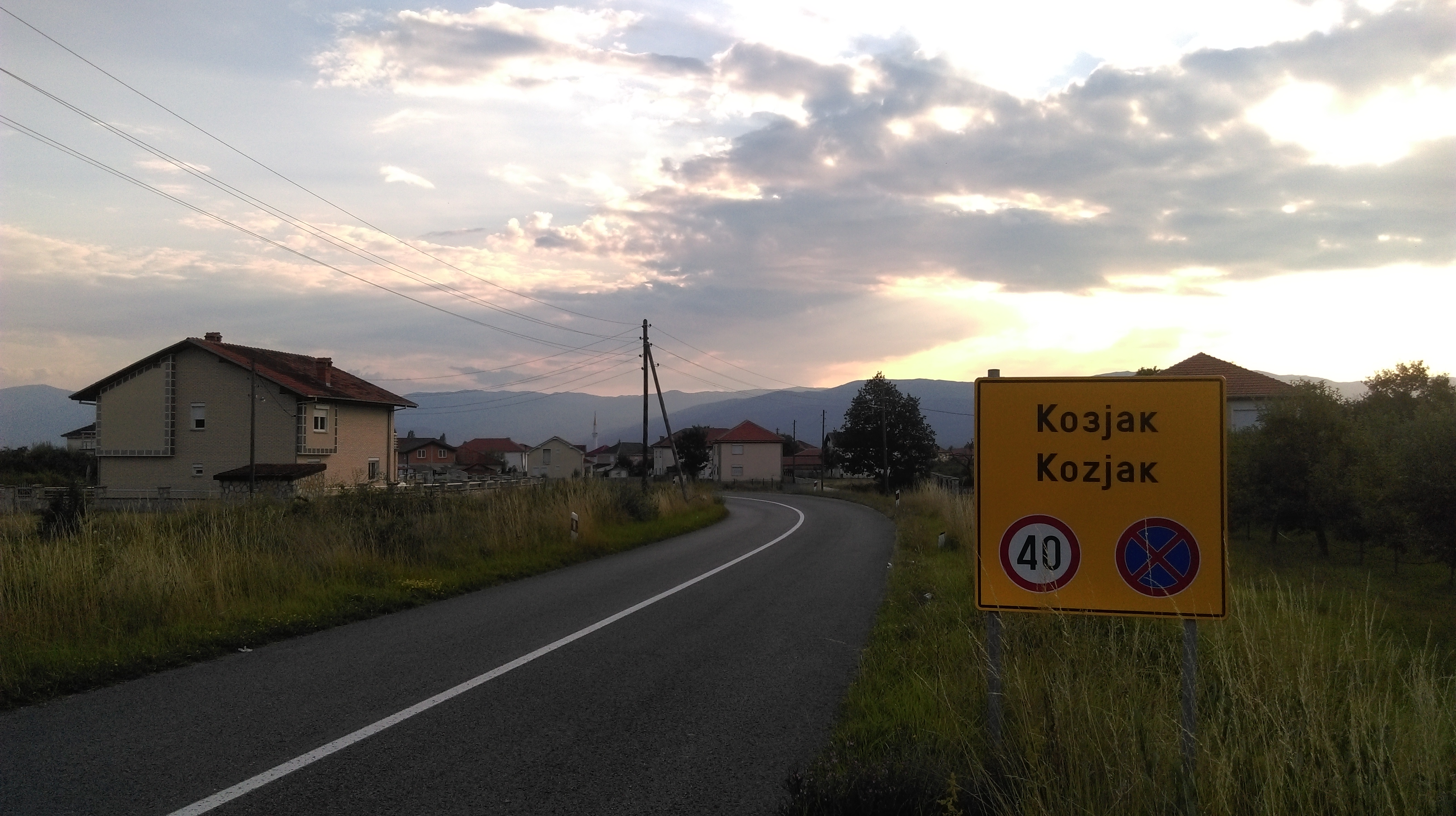
Sign hailing entrance on road into Kozjak

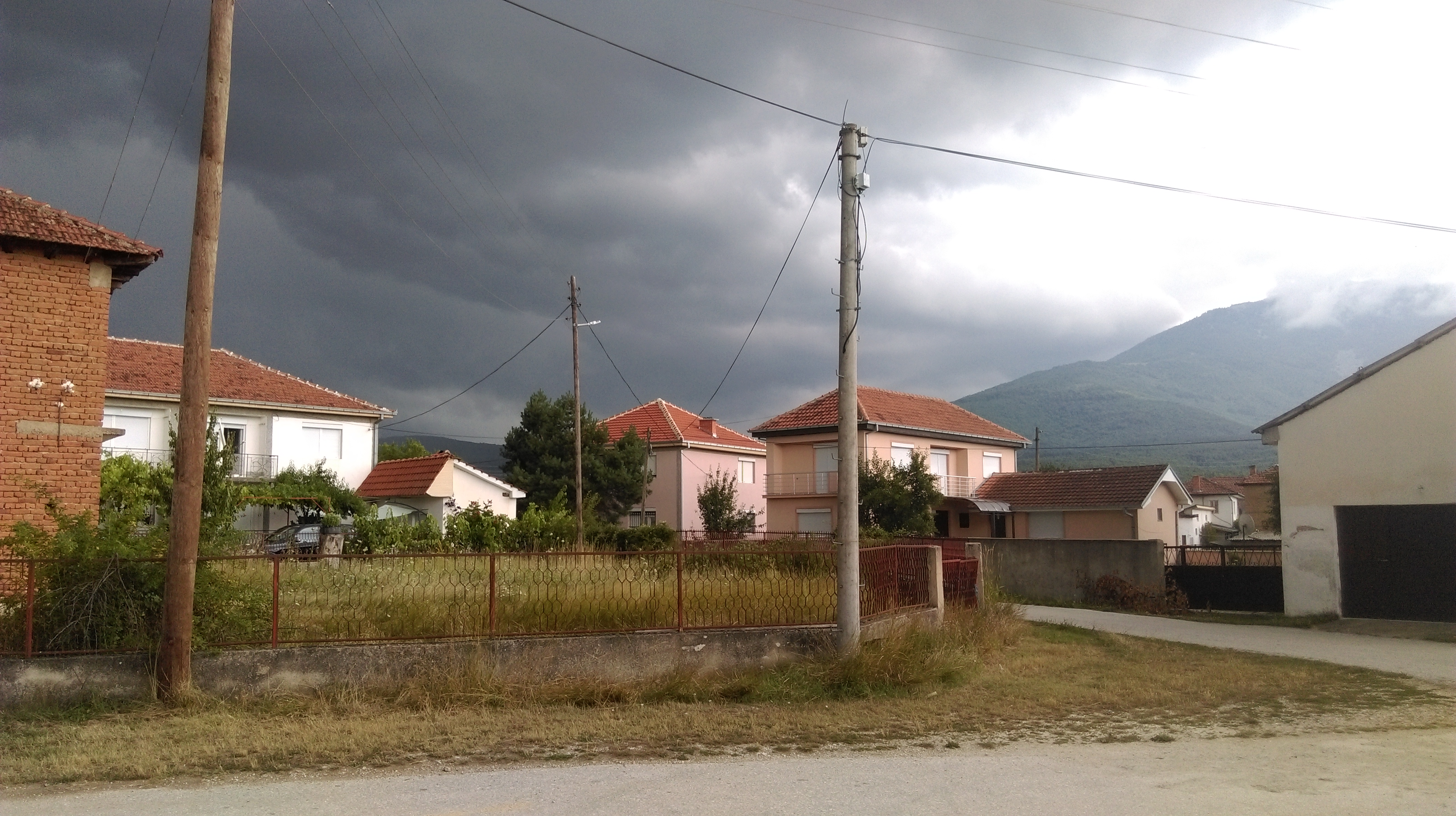
Architecture of Kozjak

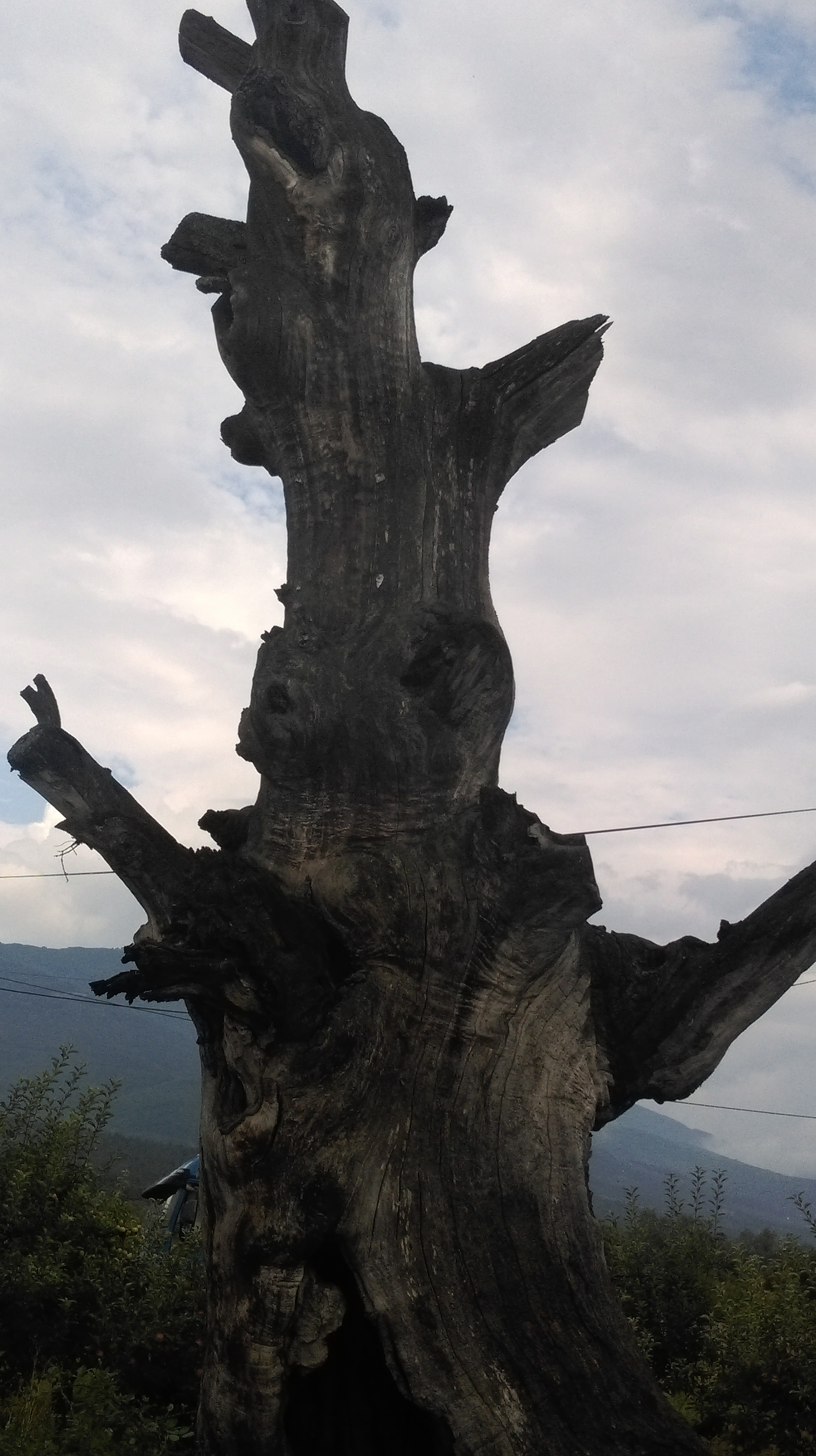
Centuries-old plane tree (now dead) in village centre

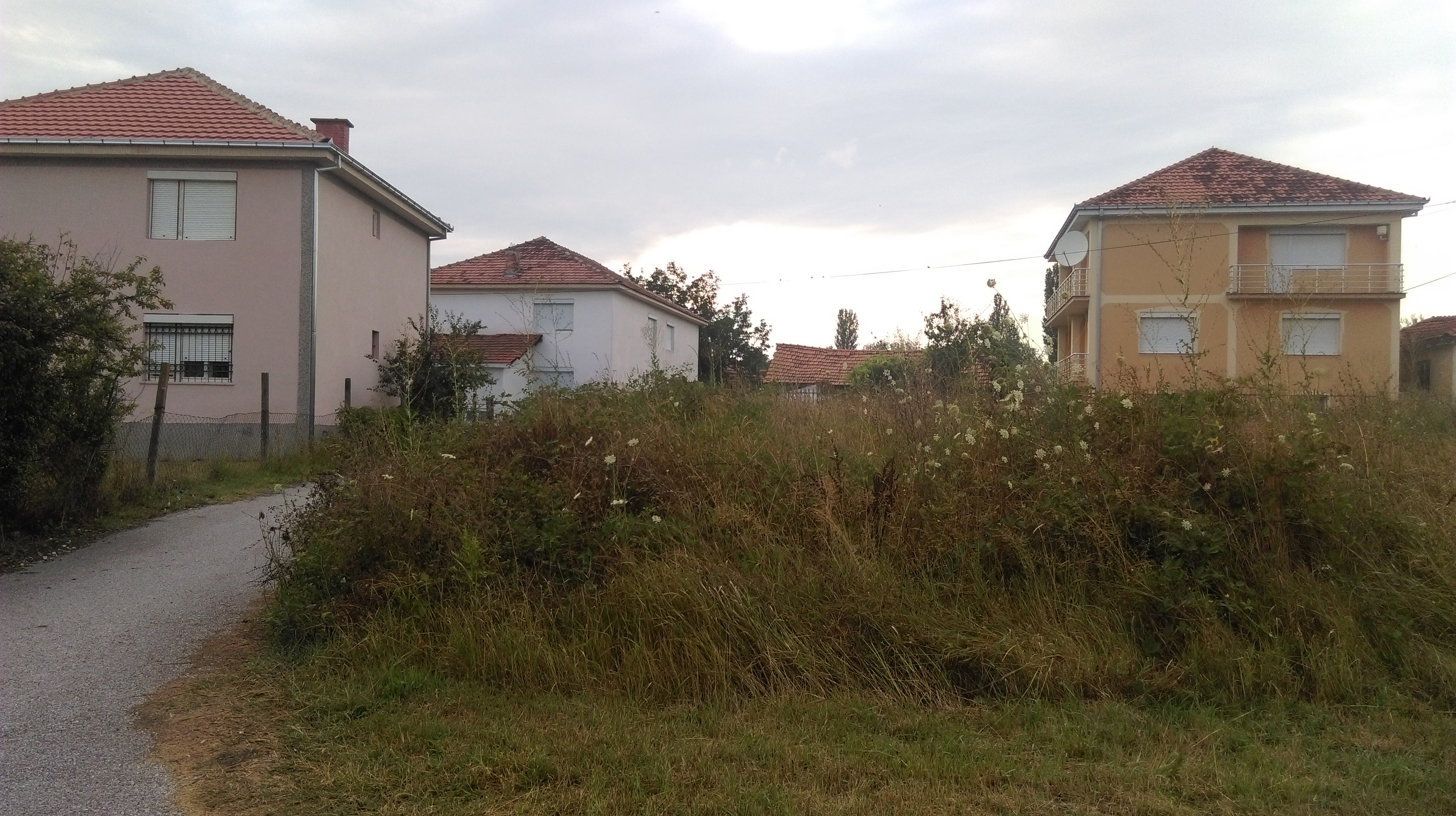
Architecture of Kozjak

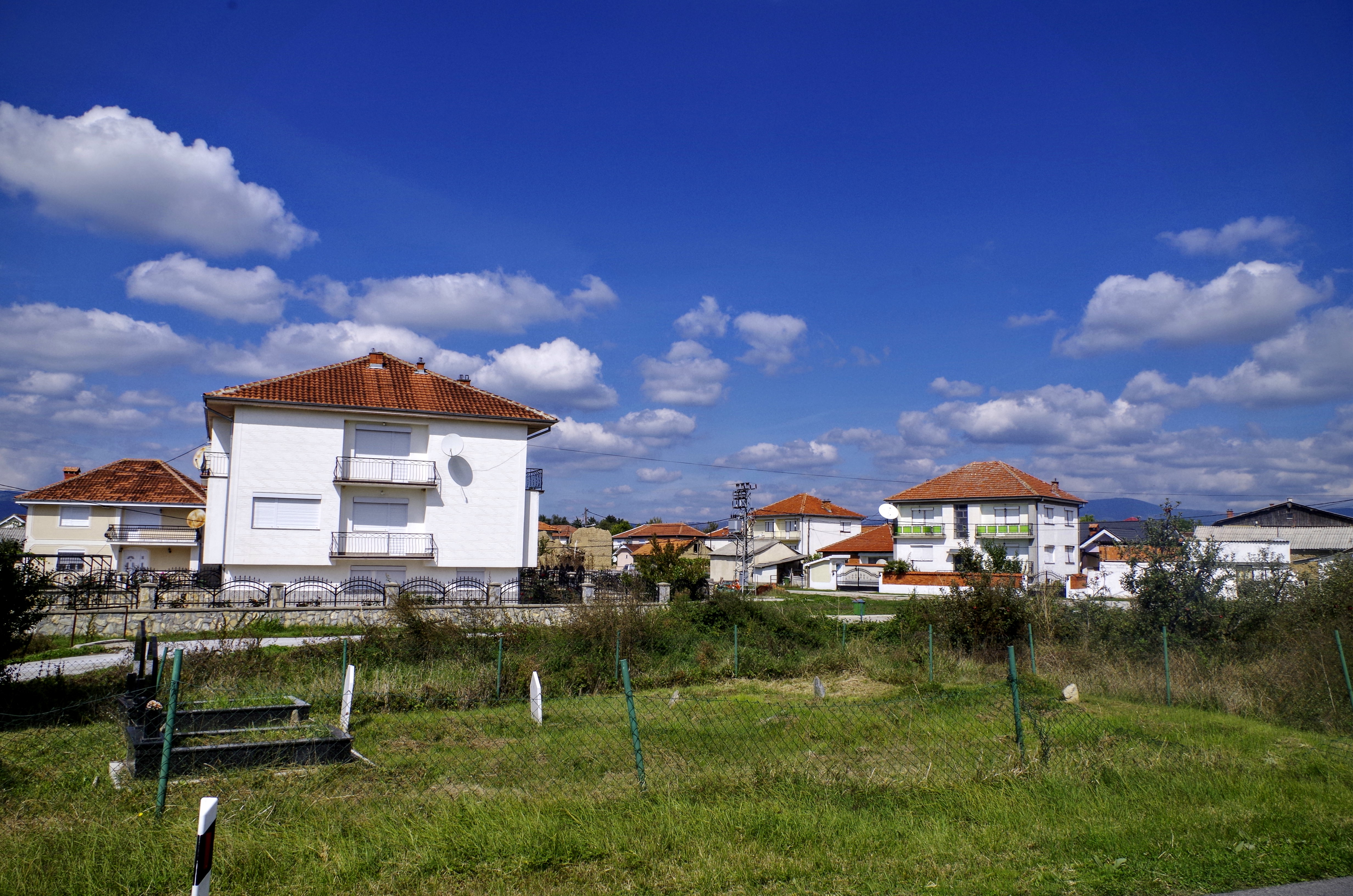
Architecture of Kozjak

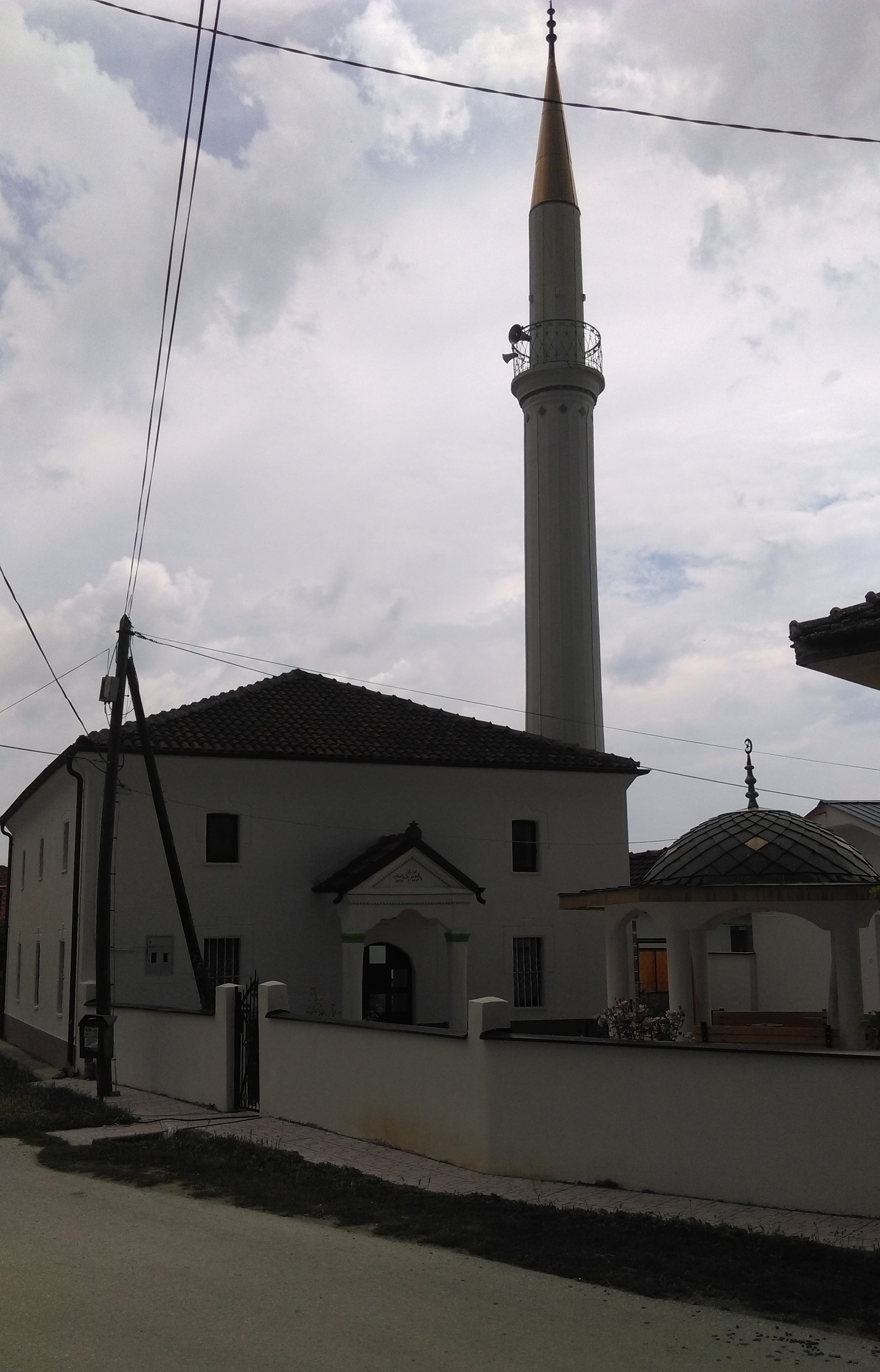
Mosque of Kozjak

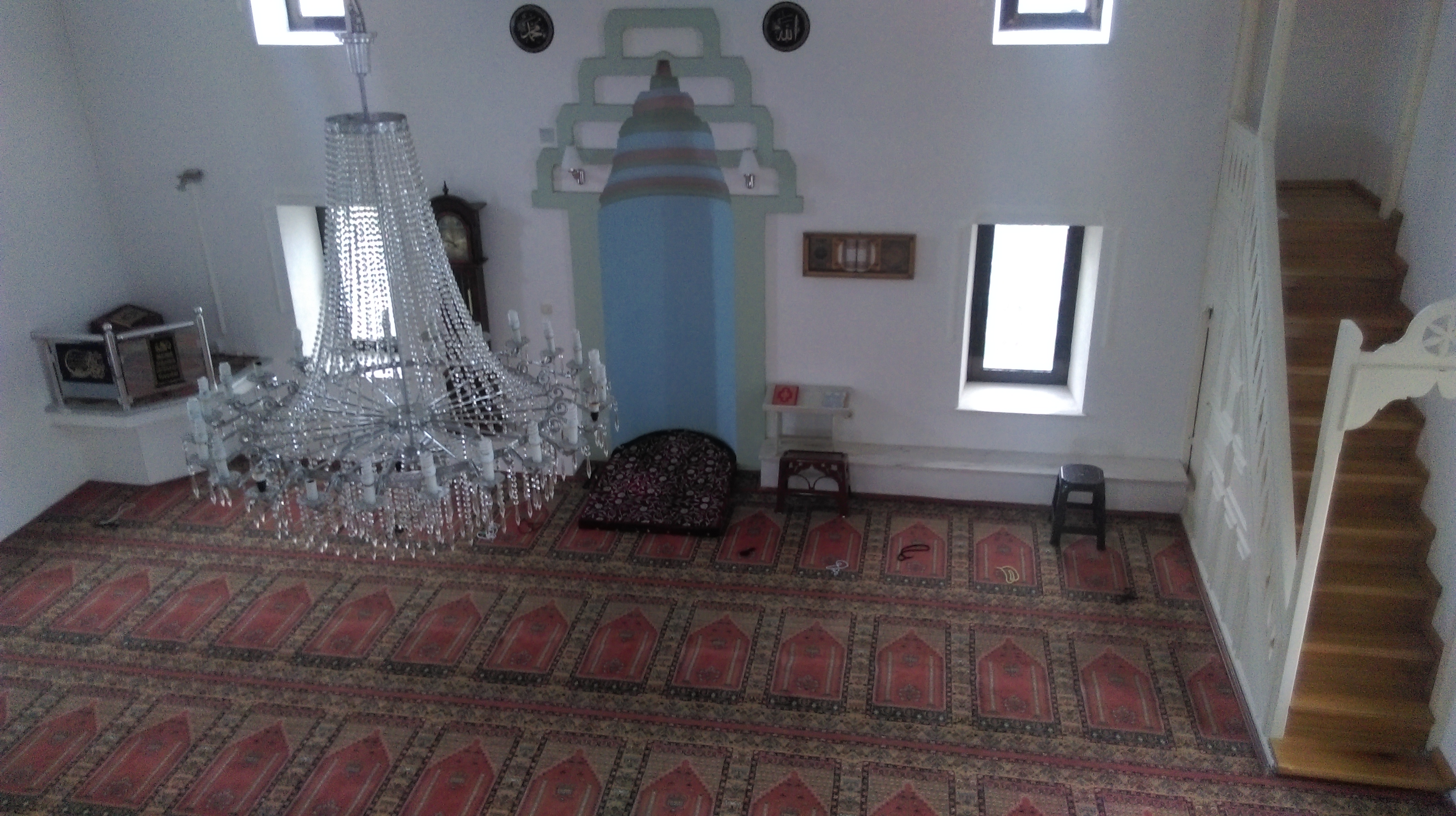
Inside of Kozjak mosque

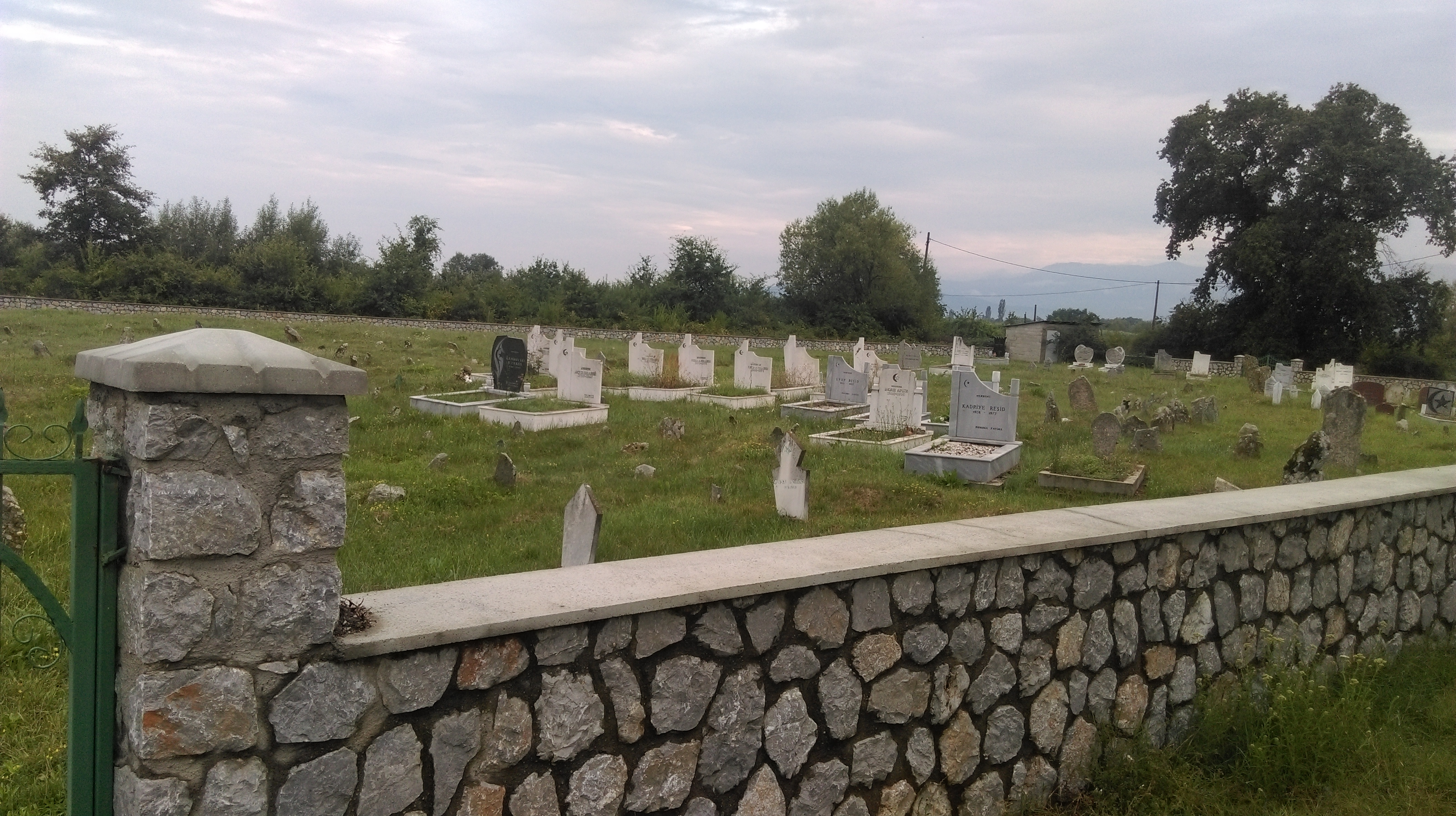
Muslim cemetery of Kozjak

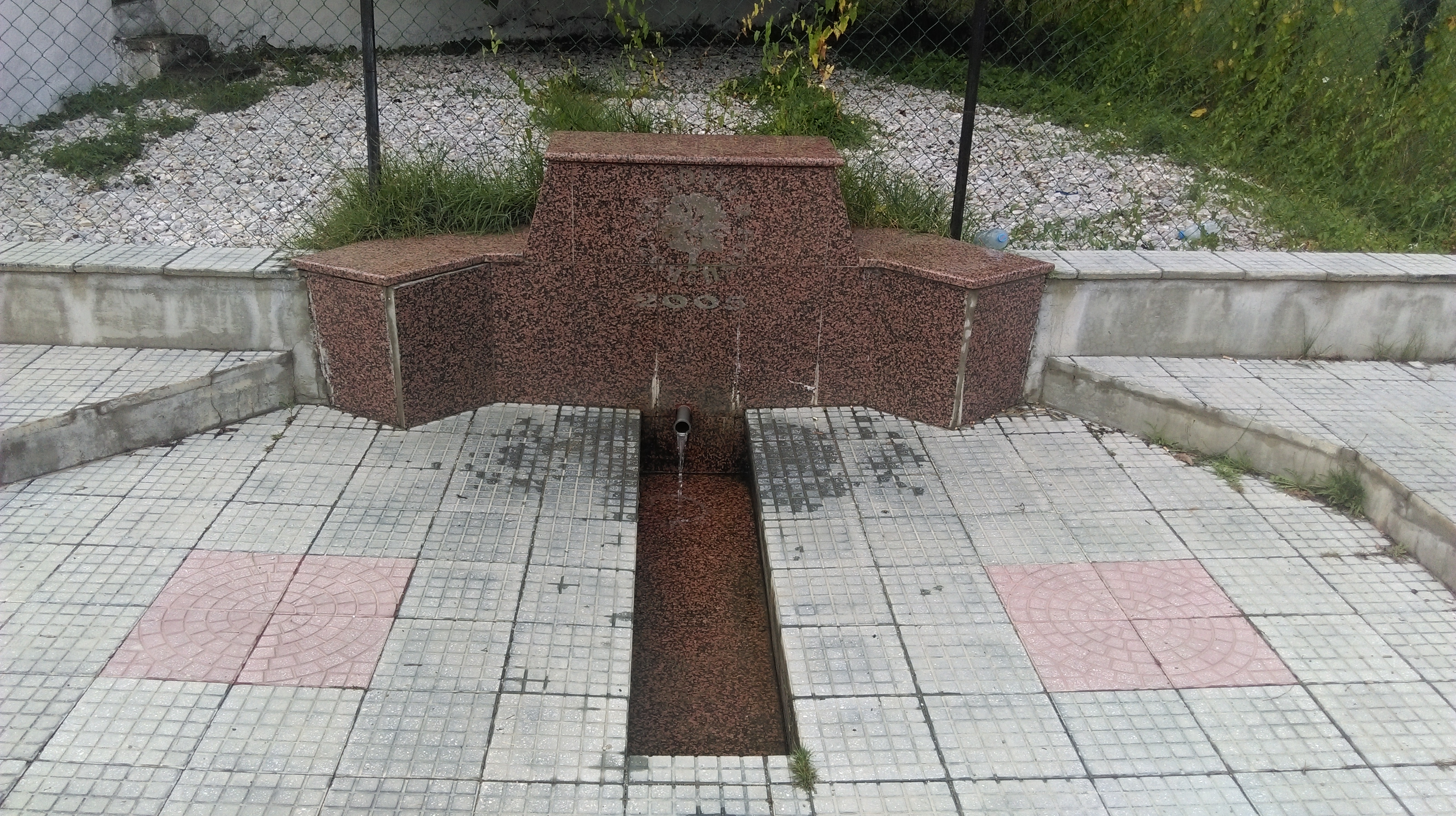
Water fountain of Kozjak

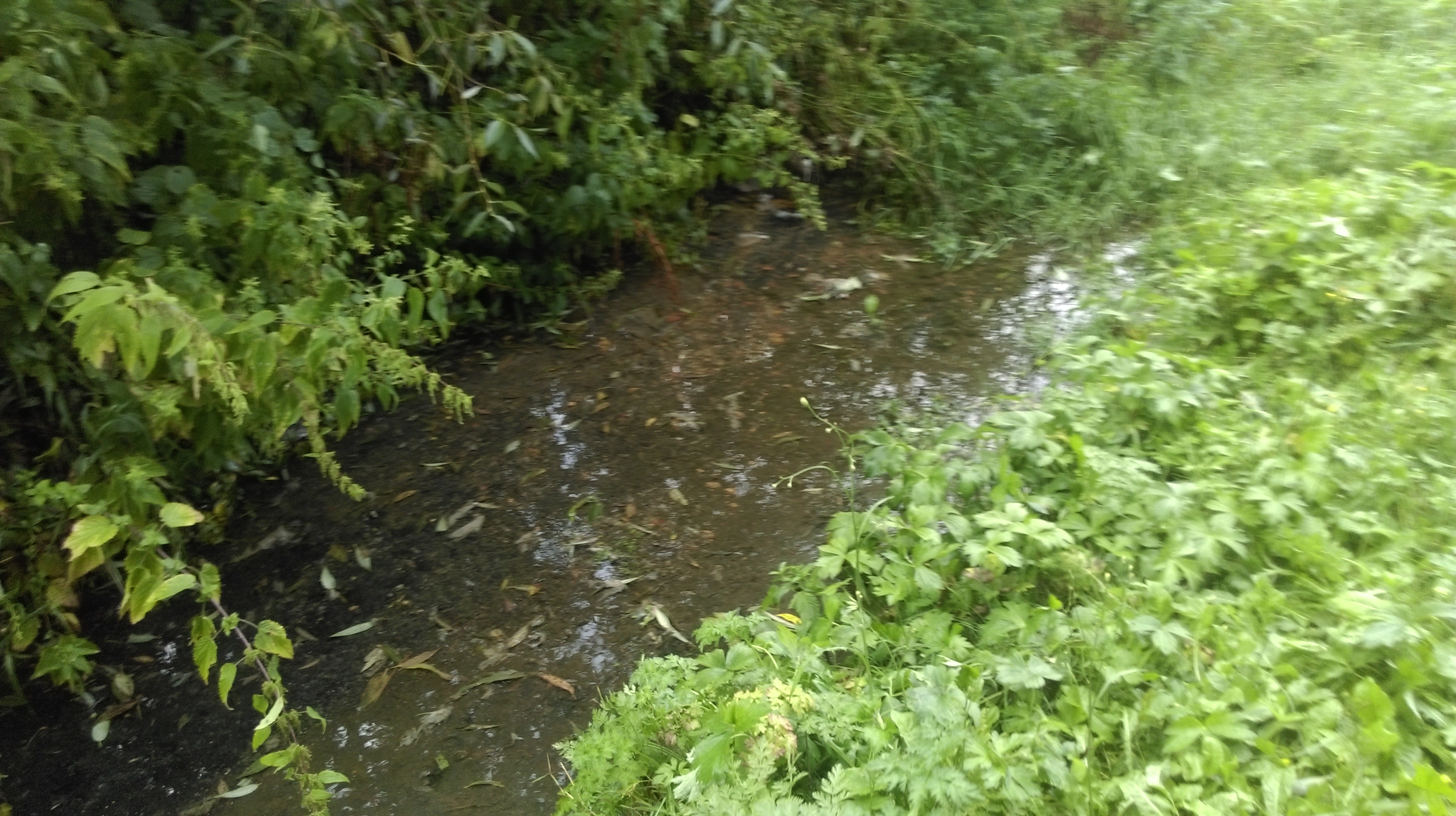
Kozjak river

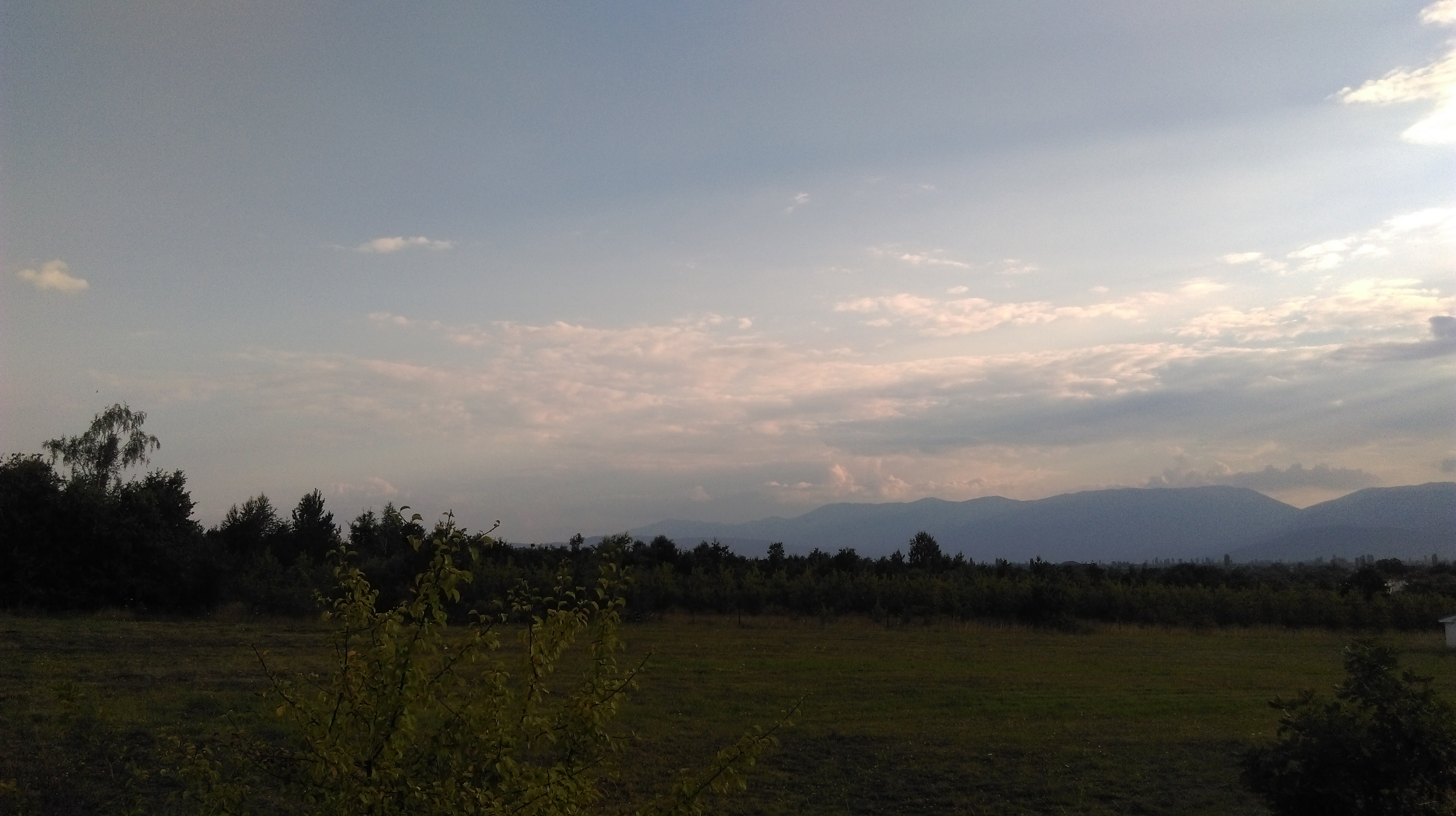
Fields of Kozjak

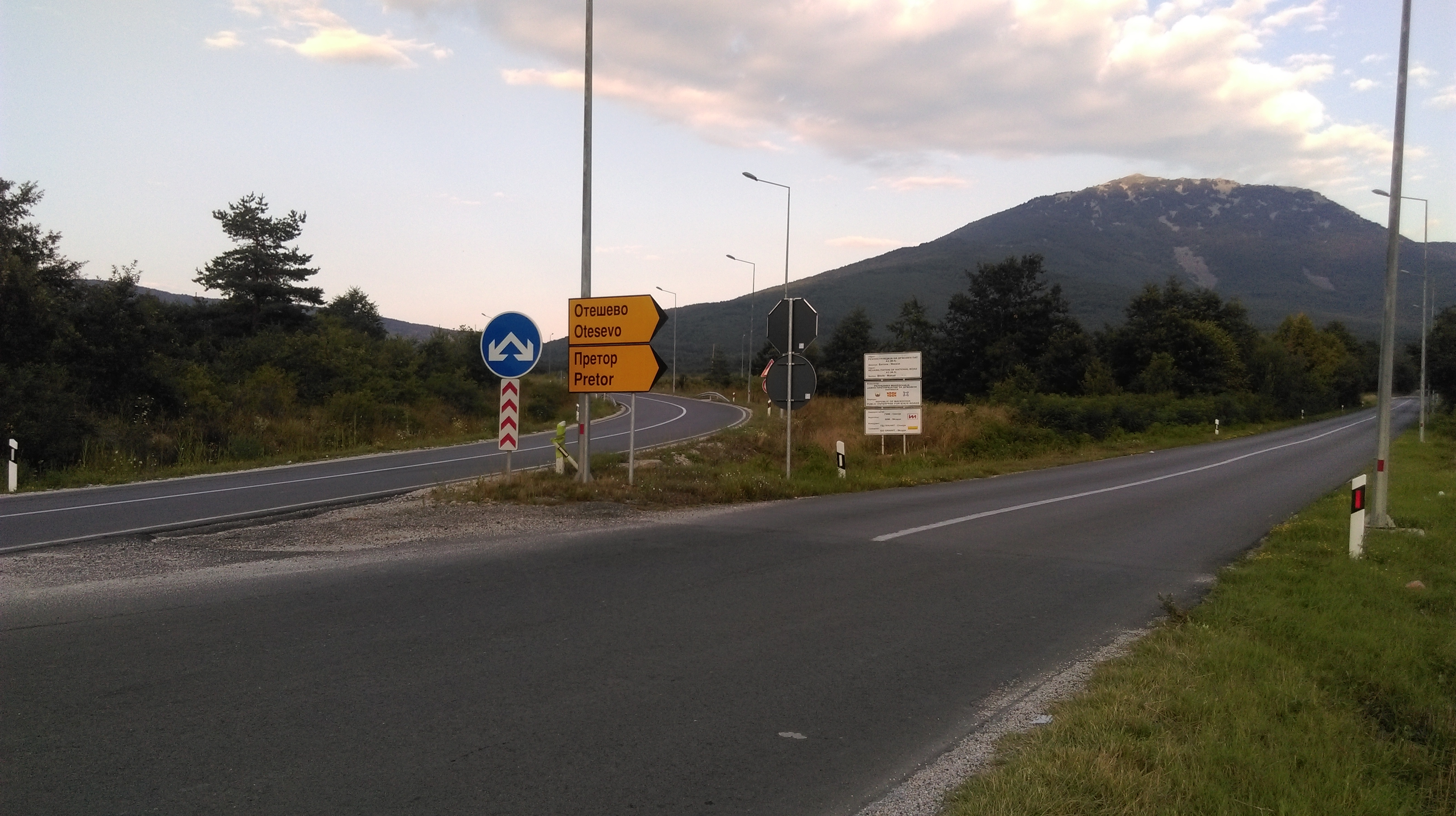
Makazi, a road intersection connecting Resen with Bitola located within Kozjak village boundaries
