= 1946 =

1946 in various calendars
- Gregorian calendar: 1946; MCMXLVI
- Ab urbe condita: 2699
- Armenian calendar: 1395; ԹՎ ՌՅՂԵ
- Assyrian calendar: 6696
- Baháʼí calendar: 102–103
- Balinese saka calendar: 1867–1868
- Bengali calendar: 1352–1353
- Berber calendar: 2896
- British Regnal year: 10 Geo. 6 – 11 Geo. 6
- Buddhist calendar: 2490
- Burmese calendar: 1308
- Byzantine calendar: 7454–7455
- Chinese calendar: 乙酉年 (Wood Rooster); 4643 or 4436 — to — 丙戌年 (Fire Dog); 4644 or 4437
- Coptic calendar: 1662–1663
- Discordian calendar: 3112
- Ethiopian calendar: 1938–1939
- Hebrew calendar: 5706–5707
- Hindu calendars
- Vikram Samvat: 2002–2003
- Shaka Samvat: 1867–1868
- Kali Yuga: 5046–5047
- Holocene calendar: 11946
- Igbo calendar: 946–947
- Iranian calendar: 1324–1325
- Islamic calendar: 1365–1366
- Japanese calendar: Shōwa 21 (昭和２１年)
- Javanese calendar: 1876–1878
- Juche calendar: 35
- Julian calendar: Gregorian minus 13 days
- Korean calendar: 4279
- Minguo calendar: ROC 35 民國35年
- Nanakshahi calendar: 478
- Thai solar calendar: 2489
- Tibetan calendar: ཤིང་མོ་བྱ་ལོ་ (female Wood-Bird); 2072 or 1691 or 919 — to — མེ་ཕོ་ཁྱི་ལོ་ (male Fire-Dog); 2073 or 1692 or 920

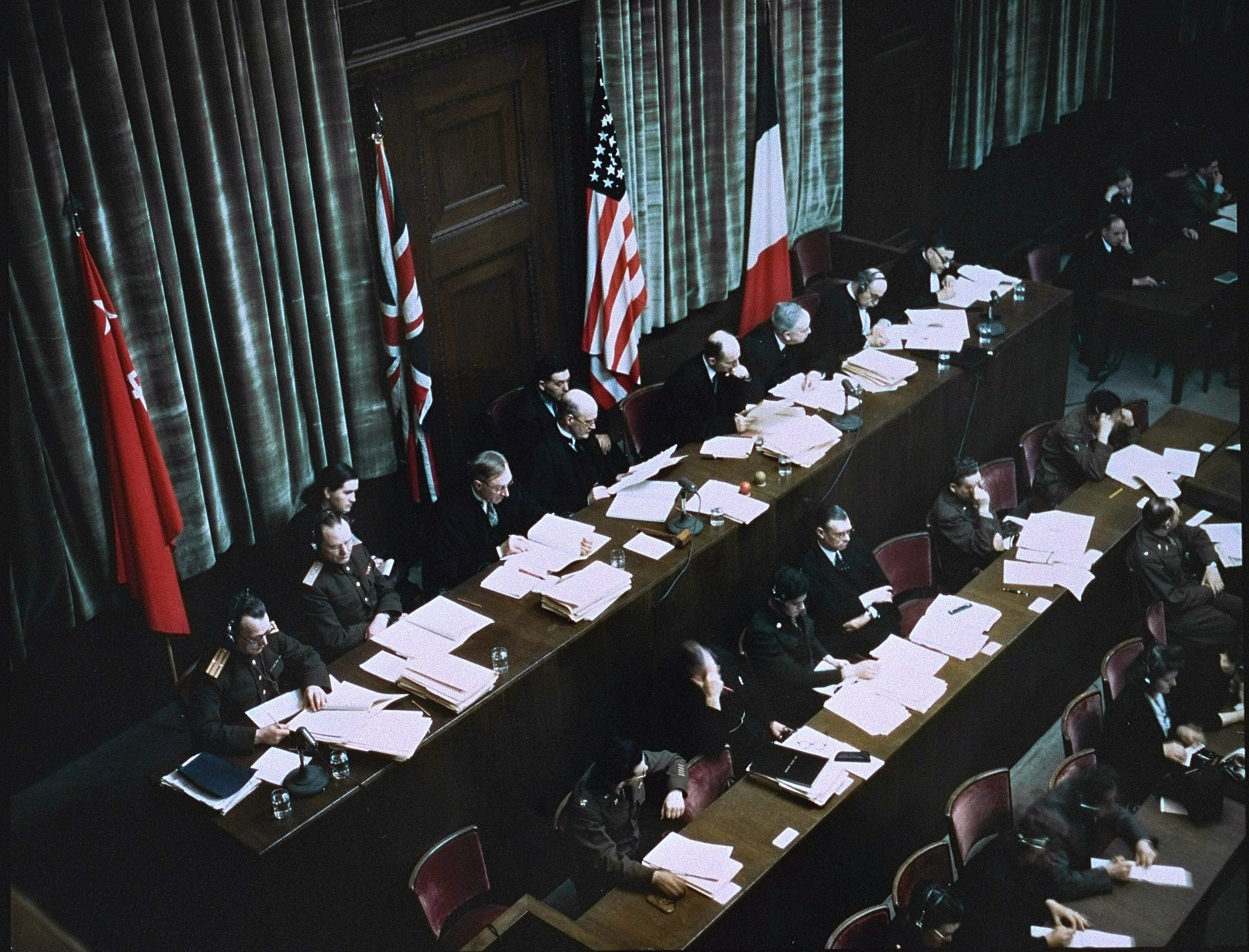
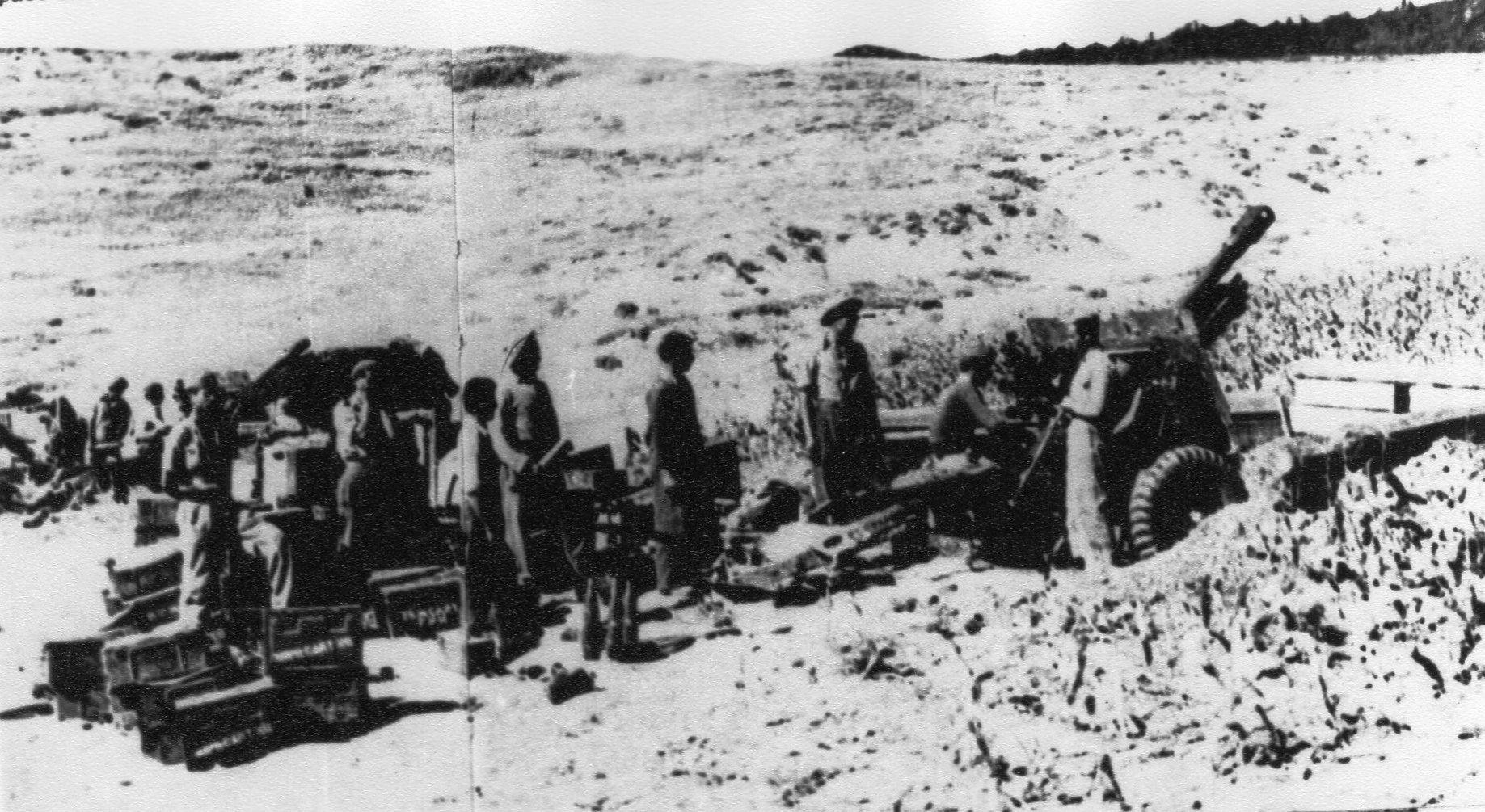
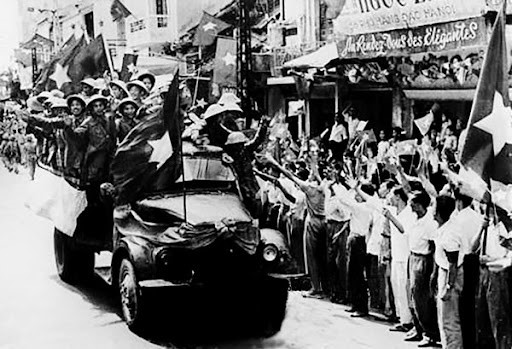
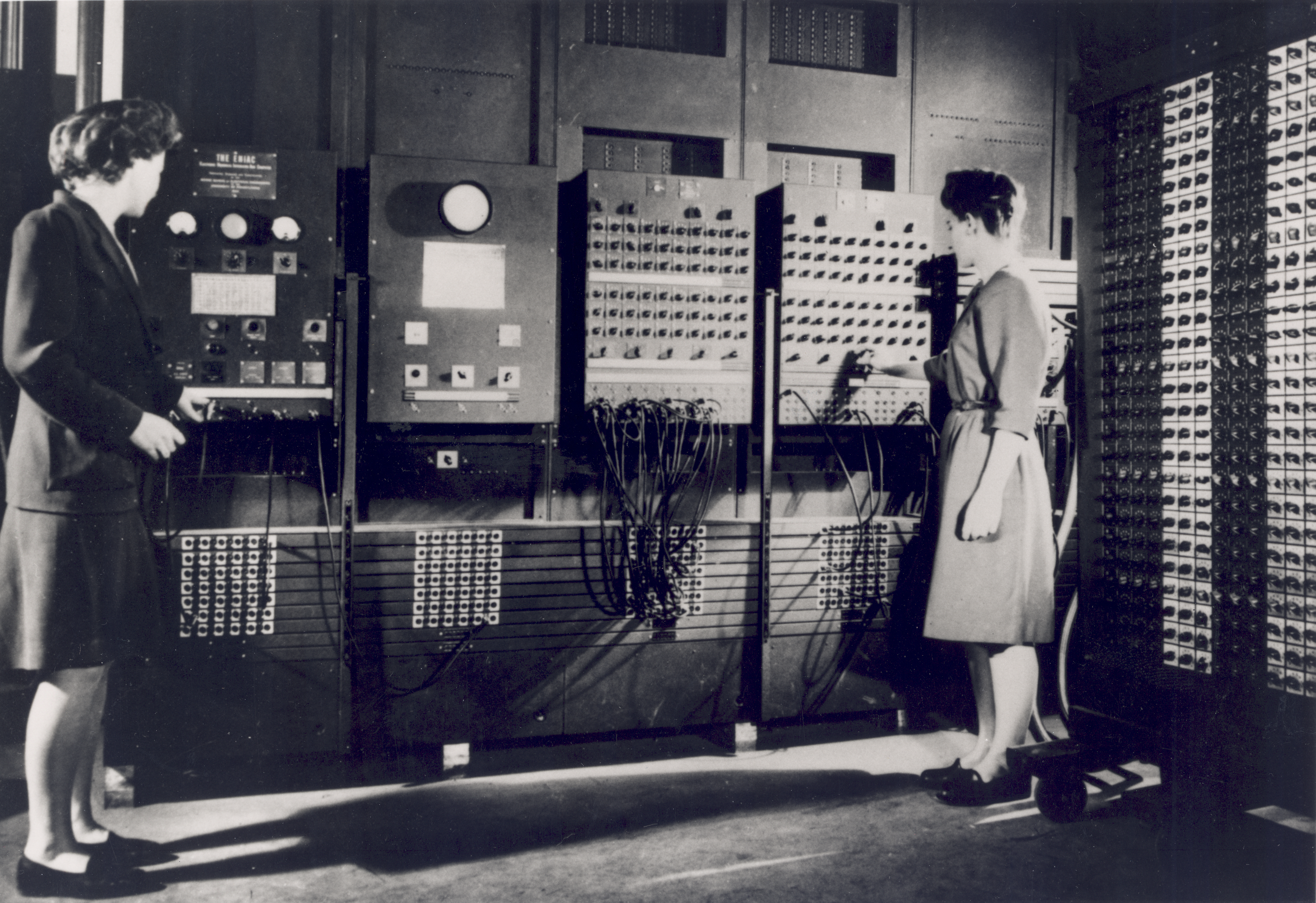
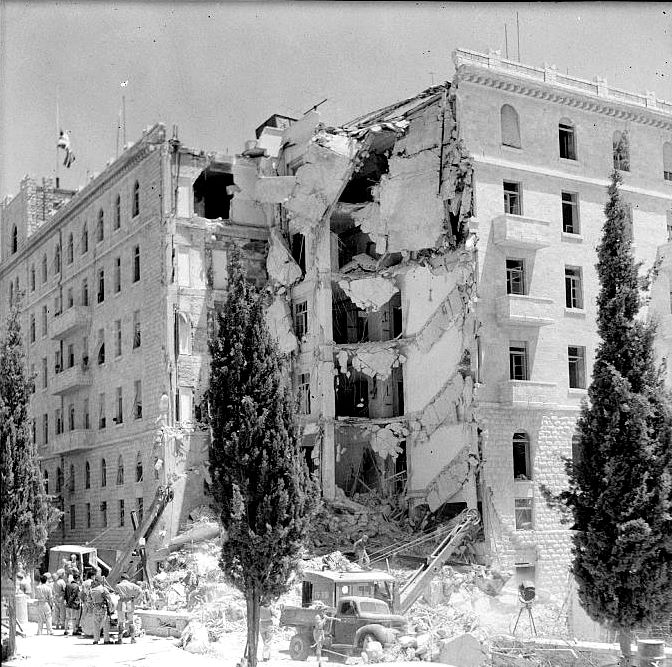
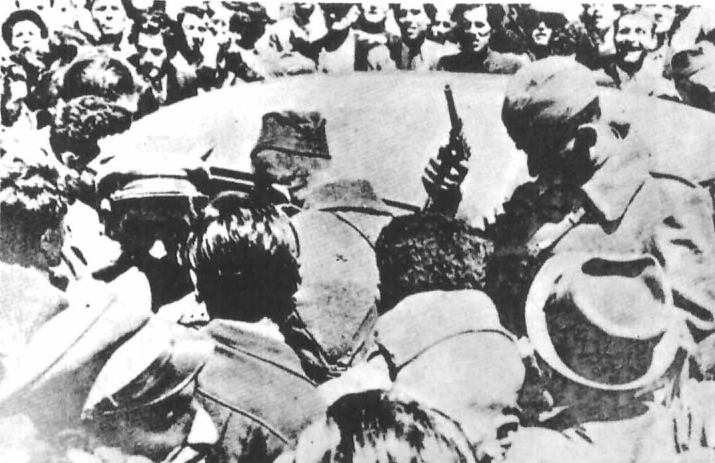
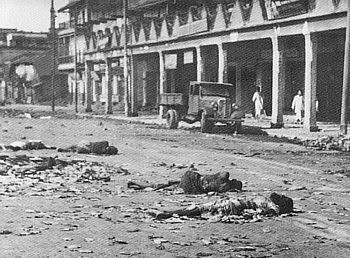
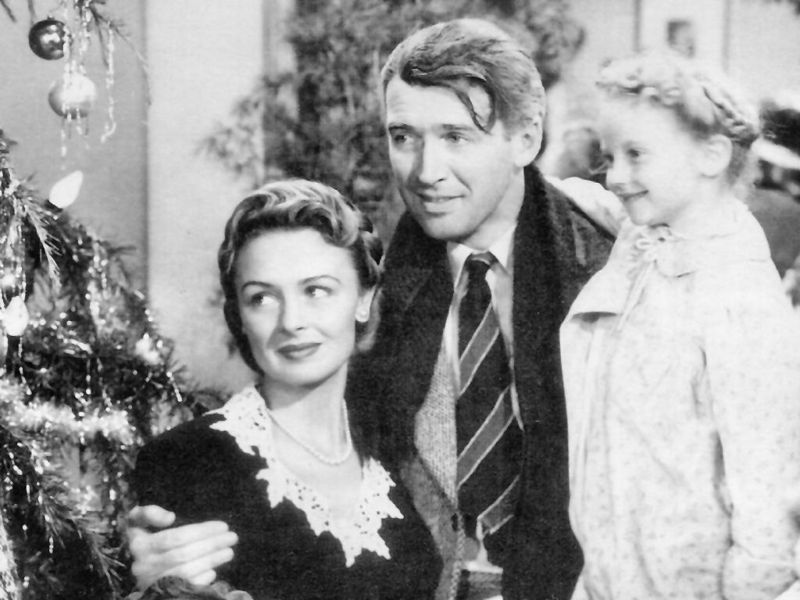
From top to bottom, left to right:
- The Nuremberg Trials deliver landmark verdicts against top Nazi leaders, establishing precedents in international law;
- The Nuclear testing at Bikini Atoll begins as the United States detonates atomic bombs in the Pacific, ushering in the nuclear age;
- The Greek Civil War erupts, one of the first proxy conflicts of the Cold War;
- The First Indochina War begins as the Viet Minh fight French colonial rule in Vietnam;
- The launch of the ENIAC computer marks a milestone in modern computing;
- The King David Hotel bombing by Irgun targets British headquarters in Jerusalem, escalating tensions in Mandatory Palestine;
- The Iran crisis of 1946 tests Western resolve as Soviet troops delay withdrawal from northern Iran;
- Direct Action Day sparks deadly communal riots in Calcutta, intensifying tensions ahead of Partition;
- The release of It's a Wonderful Life which becomes an enduring film classic.

1946 (MCMXLVI) was a common year starting on Tuesday of the Gregorian calendar, the 1946th year of the Common Era (CE) and Anno Domini (AD) designations, the 946th year of the 2nd millennium, the 46th year of the 20th century, and the 7th year of the 1940s decade.

== Events ==
=== January ===
January 10: First meeting of the UN.

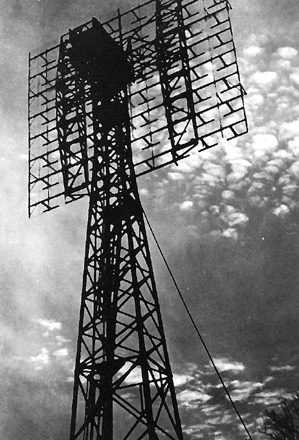
January 10: Project Diana

- January 6 – The first general election ever in Vietnam is held.
- January 7 – The Allies of World War II recognize the Austrian republic with its 1937 borders, and divide the country into four occupation zones.
- January 10
  - The first meeting of the United Nations is held, at Methodist Central Hall Westminster in London.
  - Project Diana bounces radar waves off the Moon, measuring the exact distance between the Earth and the Moon, and proves that communication is possible between Earth and outer space, effectively opening the Space Age.
- January 11 – Enver Hoxha declares the People's Republic of Albania, with himself as prime minister. He will remain effectively as a dictator of the country until his death in 1985.
- January 16 – Charles de Gaulle resigns as head of the French provisional government.
- January 17 – The United Nations Security Council holds its first session, at Church House, Westminster in London.
- January 19
  - The Bell XS-1 is test flown for the first time (unpowered), with Bell's chief test pilot Jack Woolams at the controls.
  - General Douglas MacArthur establishes the International Military Tribunal for the Far East in Tokyo, to try Japanese war criminals.
  - Expulsion of Germans of Hungary begins from Wudersch.
- January 20 – Charles de Gaulle resigns as president of France.
- January 22
  - Iran crisis of 1946: Qazi Muhammad declares the independent people's Republic of Mahabad, at the Chahar Cheragh Square in the Kurdish city of Mahabad. He is the new president; Haji Baba Sheikh is the prime minister.
  - The National Intelligence Authority, and its operational arm, the Central Intelligence Group, are established in the United States; these become part of the Central Intelligence Agency in 1947.

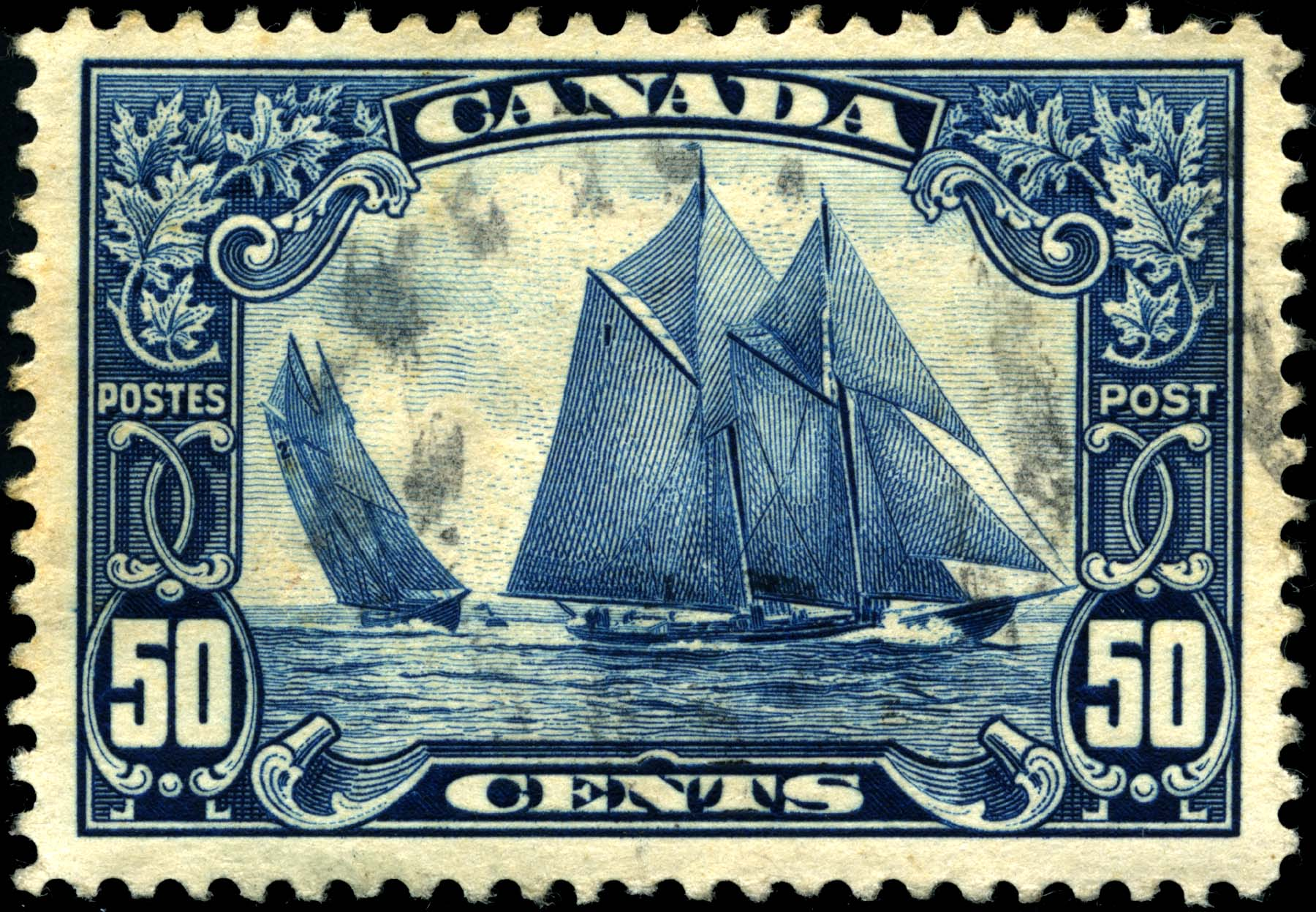
January 28: Bluenose founders.

- January 28 – The Canadian schooner Bluenose founders on a Haitian reef.
- January 31
  - The last session of the Permanent Court of International Justice occurs.
  - Yugoslavia's new constitution, modeled on the Soviet Union, establishes 6 constituent republics (Bosnia and Herzegovina, Croatia, Macedonia, Montenegro, Serbia and Slovenia).

=== February ===
- February 1
  - Trygve Lie of Norway is selected as the first United Nations Secretary-General.
  - The Kingdom of Hungary becomes a republic, heavily influenced by the Soviet Union.
- February 14 – ENIAC (for "Electronic Numerical Integrator and Computer"), an early general-purpose electronic computer, is unveiled at the University of Pennsylvania; it weighs 60,000 pounds (over 27 tons), and occupies a big room.
- February 15 – The Gouzenko Affair: Canada announces the discovery of a ring of Canadian communist spies based at the Soviet embassy in Ottawa, passing atomic bomb secrets to Russia.
- February 20 – An explosion kills more than 400 coal miners in Bergkamen, West Germany.
- February 24 – Juan Perón is elected president of Argentina.

=== March ===
- March 2
  - British troops withdraw from Iran according to treaty; the Soviets do not.
  - Ho Chi Minh is elected President of North Vietnam.
- March 4 – C. G. E. Mannerheim resigns as president of Finland.
- March 5 – In a speech at Westminster College, in Fulton, Missouri, Winston Churchill talks about the Iron Curtain.
- March 6 – First Indochina War: Ho Chi Minh signs an agreement with France, which recognizes Vietnam as an autonomous state in the Indochinese Federation and the French Union.
- March 7 – The 18th Academy Awards Ceremony is held. Best Picture goes to The Lost Weekend.
- March 8 – The Bell 47 becomes the first helicopter certified for civilian use in the United States
- March 9 – Juho Kusti Paasikivi becomes the 7th President of Finland.
- March 19
  - The Soviet Union and Switzerland resume diplomatic relations.
  - French Guiana, Guadeloupe, Martinique and Réunion become overseas départements of France.
- March 22 – The United Kingdom grants the British protectorate of the Emirate of Transjordan (later known as Jordan) its independence by the Treaty of London.
- March 29 – The Gold Coast has an African majority in its parliament.

=== April ===
- April 1
  - The 8.6 M_{w} Aleutian Islands earthquake shakes the Aleutian Islands, with a maximum Mercalli intensity of VI (Strong). A destructive tsunami reaches the Hawaiian Islands, resulting in many deaths, mostly in Hilo. Between 165 and 173 are killed.
  - The Malayan Union is formed on dissolution of the British Military Administration and Singapore becomes a Crown colony.
  - The Battle of Määritsa takes place between Estonian partisans and Soviet forces in southeastern Estonia.
- April 3 – Japanese Lt. General Masaharu Homma is executed outside Manila in the Philippines, for leading the Bataan Death March.
- April 5 – A British Fleet Air Arm Vickers Wellington crashes into a residential area in Rabat, Malta during a training exercise, killing all 4 crew members and 16 civilians on the ground.
- April 10 – In Japan, women vote for the first time, during elections for the House of Representatives of the 90th Imperial Diet.
- April 14 – Sh'erit ha-Pletah members of Nakam, the "Jewish Avengers", use arsenic to poison bread baked for SS prisoners of war held at Stalag XIII-D by the Americans.
- April 17 – Syria's independence from France is officially recognized.
- April 18
  - The inaugural session of the International Court of Justice (ICJ) takes place at The Hague.
  - The League of Nations, in its last meeting, transfers its mission to the United Nations and disbands itself.
  - The United States recognizes Josip Broz Tito's government in the Socialist Federal Republic of Yugoslavia.
- April 25 – Naperville train disaster: The Chicago, Burlington & Quincy's Exposition Flyer crashes at speed into the rear of the Advance Flyer at Loomis Street in Naperville, Illinois; 45 are killed.
- April 28 – Kinderdorf Pestalozzi (Pestalozzi Children's Village) is established at Trogen, Switzerland to accommodate and educate orphans of World War II, according to Johann Heinrich Pestalozzi's principles.
- April 29 – Trials against war criminals begin in Tokyo; the accused include Hideki Tojo, Shigenori Tōgō and Hiroshi Ōshima.

=== May ===
- May 1 – At least 800 Indigenous Australian pastoral workers walk off the job in Northwest Western Australia, starting one of the longest industrial strikes in Australia.
- May 7 – Tokyo Telecommunications Engineering (later renamed Sony) is founded, with about 20 employees.
- May 9 – King Victor Emmanuel III of Italy abdicates, and is succeeded by his son Umberto II.
- May 10
  - Jawaharlal Nehru is elected leader of the Congress Party in India.
  - The first V-2 rocket to be successfully launched in the United States is fired from White Sands Missile Range.
- May 21 – Manhattan Project physicist Louis Slotin accidentally triggers a fission reaction at the Los Alamos National Laboratory in the United States and, although saving his coworkers, gives himself a lethal dose of ionizing radiation, making him the second victim of a criticality accident in history (the incident is initially treated as classified information).
- May 23–24 – A two-day violent tornado outbreak occurs across the Central United States, with at least 15 significant tornadoes killing four people and injuring 42 others.
- May 25 – The Emirate of Transjordan becomes the Hashemite Kingdom of Transjordan when its parliament makes the ruling amir Abdullah their king on the day it ratifies the Treaty of London.
- May 26 – 1946 Czechoslovak parliamentary election: The communist party wins 38% of the vote in the last election before communists take power.
- May 31 – The 1946 Greek referendum supports the return of the monarchy.

=== June ===
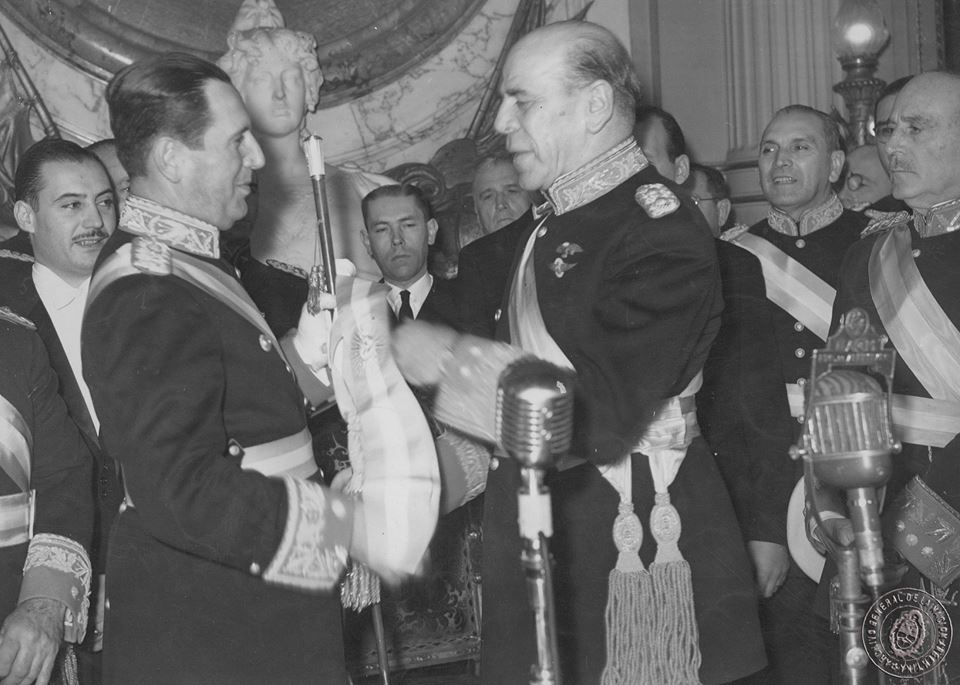
Juan Domingo Perón assumes the presidency of Argentina on June 4.

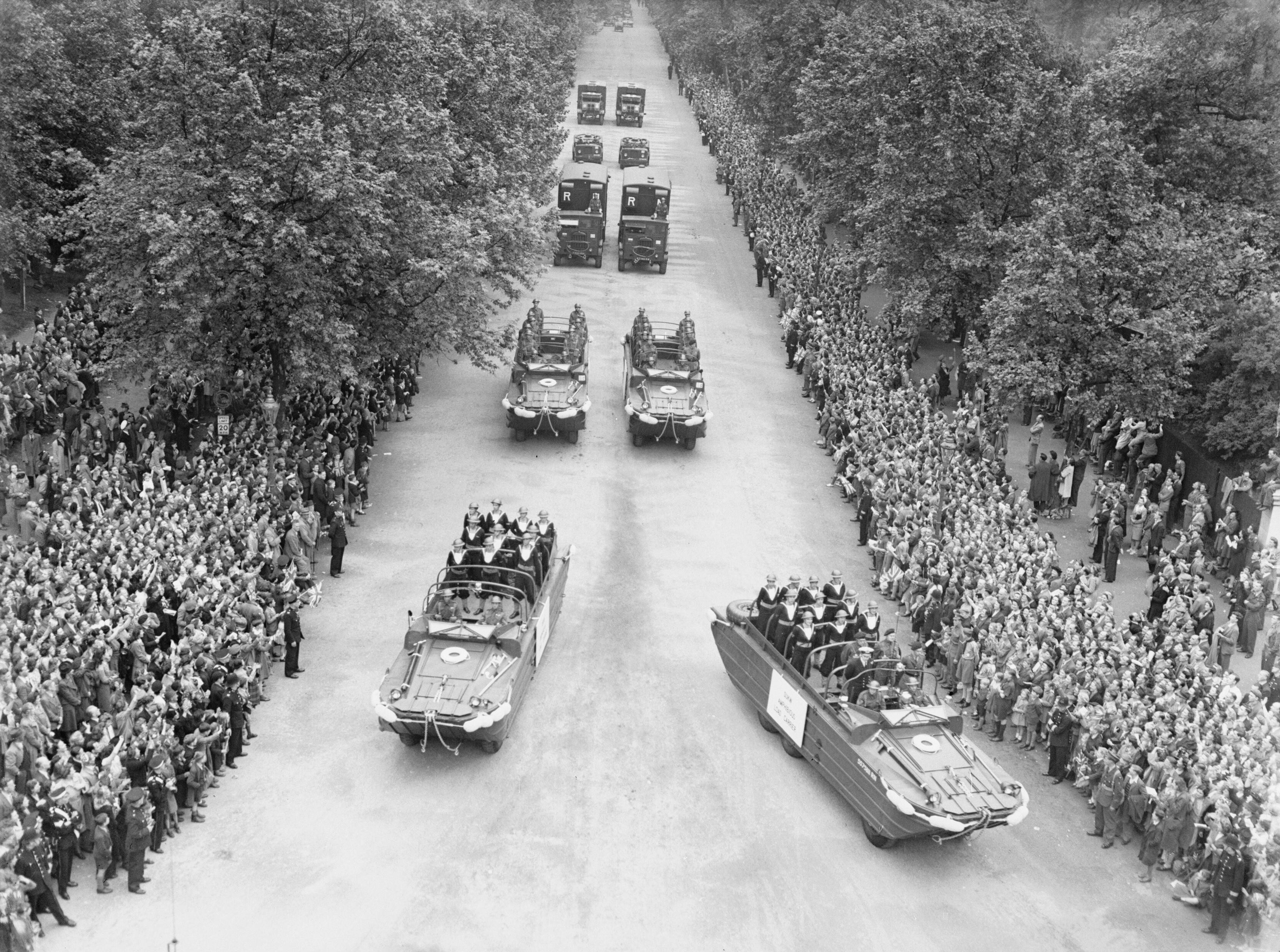
Four DUKW amphibious vehicles taking part in the Victory Parade in London on 8 June 1946

- June 1
  - Ion Antonescu, prime minister and "Conducator" (Leader) of Romania during World War II, is executed: he was found guilty of betraying the Romanian people for the benefit of Germany and sentenced to death by the Bucharest People's Tribunal.
  - D'Argenlieu, French High Commissioner for Indo-China, recognizes an autonomous "Republic of Cochin-China" in violation of the March 6 Ho–Sainteny agreement, opening the way for conflict between the Viet Minh and France.
- June 2 – 1946 Italian institutional referendum: Italians vote to turn Italy from a monarchy into a republic. In the simultaneous 1946 Italian general election, the first since the end of World War II and also the first in which women are allowed to vote, the Christian Democracy party, led by Prime Minister Alcide De Gasperi, wins most seats in the Constituent Assembly of Italy and forms a coalition government. Christian Democracy leads the Italian government continuously until 1981.
- June 3 – Interpol is re-founded; the telegraphic address "Interpol" is adopted.
- June 4 - Juan Perón was inaugurated as the twenty-ninth President of Argentina for a six-year elective term.
- June 8 – In Indonesia, Sukarno incites his supporters to fight Dutch colonial occupation.
- June 9 – In Thailand, King Bhumibol Adulyadej (Rama IX) accedes to the throne after the death of his elder brother, King Ananda Mahidol (Rama VIII). He will reign until his death on October 13, 2016.
- June 10 – Italy is declared a republic.
- June 13 – Umberto II of Italy leaves the country and goes into exile in Portugal; Alcide De Gasperi becomes head of state.
- June 14 – The Baruch Plan is proposed to the United Nations.
- June 17 – Formal ratification of the Treaty of London grants independence to the Hashemite Kingdom of Transjordan.
- June 23
  - The 7.5 M_{w} Vancouver Island earthquake affects the island, with a maximum Mercalli intensity of VIII (Severe). Two people are killed.
  - 1946 French India municipal election: The National Democratic Front wins a landslide victory.
- June 25 – The International Bank for Reconstruction and Development (IBRD) (World Bank) begins operations.
- June 30 – The War Relocation Authority, which has administered the internment of Japanese Americans, is abolished.

=== July ===
- July 1 – Nuclear testing: Operation Crossroads, a series of nuclear weapon tests conducted by the United States at Bikini Atoll in Micronesia, is initiated by the detonation of Able at an altitude of 520 feet (158 m).
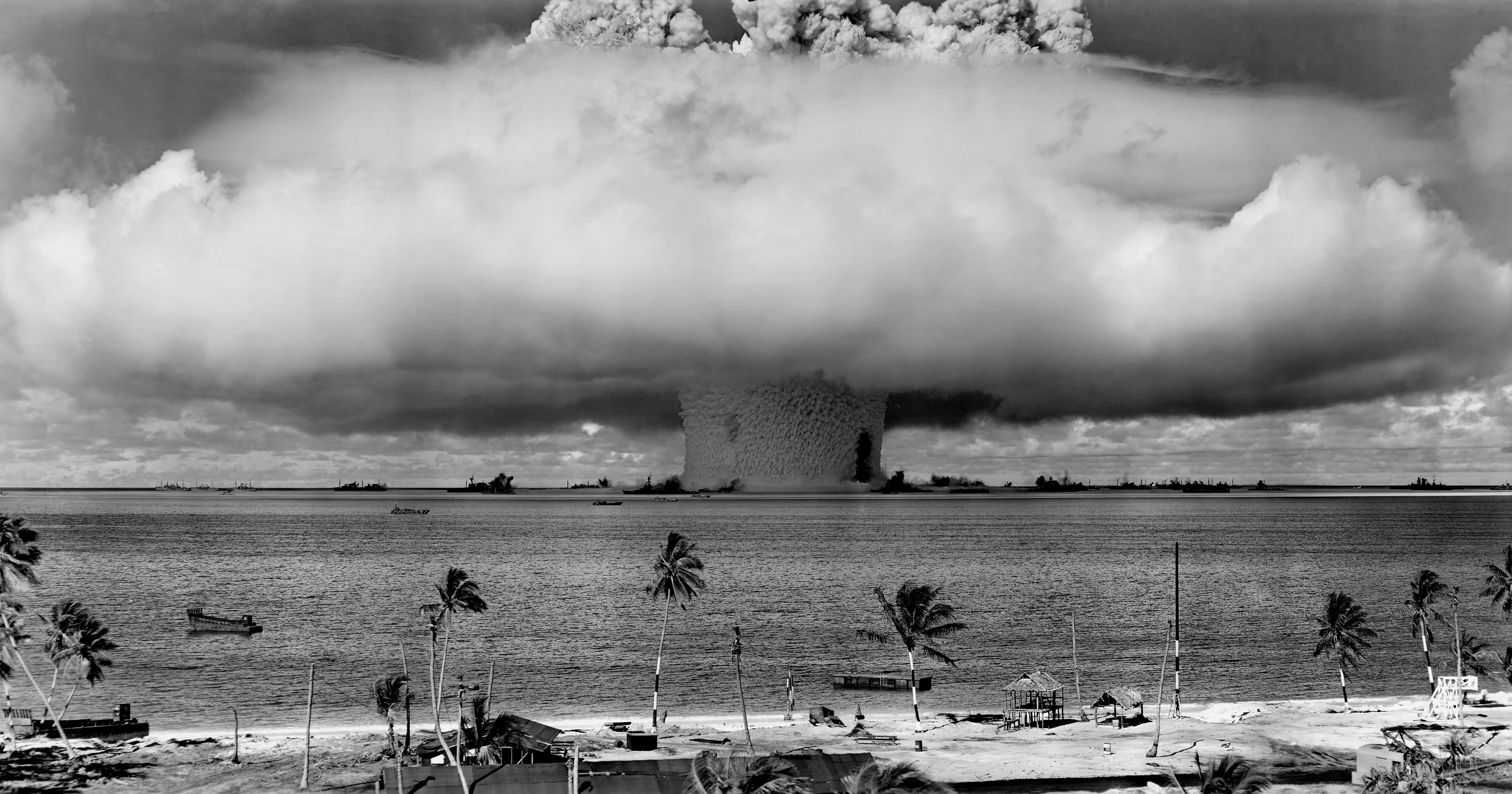
  July 25: Undersea Atomic Test Baker
- July 4
  - After more than 48 years of American dominance, the Philippines attains full independence as the 3rd Republic; Manuel A. Roxas is 5th President of the Philippines. It marks the end of nearly 400 years of colonial era when the Viceroyalty of New Spain took control since April 27, 1565.
  - The Kielce Pogrom takes place in Poland.
- July 5 – The bikini is first modeled in Paris.
- July 16 – The Bureau of Land Management (BLM) within the Department of the Interior is formed by the merger of the Grazing Service and United States General Land Office.
- July 21 – An Irgun bomb explodes in Jerusalem, during secretive talks between Jews and Britain to consolidate the state of Israel.
- July 22 – King David Hotel bombing: The Irgun bombs the King David Hotel (headquarters of the British civil and military administration) in Jerusalem, killing 90.
- July 25
  - Nuclear testing: In the first underwater test of the atomic bomb, the surplus USS Saratoga is sunk near Bikini Atoll in the Pacific Ocean, when the United States detonates the Baker device during Operation Crossroads.
  - At Club 500 in Atlantic City, New Jersey, Dean Martin and Jerry Lewis stage their first show as a comedy team.
  - In the last mass lynching in the United States, a mob of white men shoot and kill two African-American couples, near Moore's Ford Bridge in Georgia.

=== August ===
- August 1 – The Scandinavian Airlines System is founded as a consortium of the flag carriers of Sweden, Denmark and Norway.
- August 3 – Santa Claus Land opens to the public at Santa Claus, Indiana. It becomes the first themed park, preceding Disneyland by 9 years, and is later renamed Holiday World.
- August 4 – The 1946 Dominican Republic earthquake (magnitude 8.0) hits the northern Dominican Republic, killing 100 and leaving 20,000 homeless.
- August 7 – The Soviet Union escalates the Turkish Straits crisis through a diplomatic demand to Turkey.
- August 16
  - Direct Action Day: Violence between Muslims and Hindus in Calcutta begins "The Week of the Long Knives", which leaves 3,000 dead.
  - The All Hyderabad Trade Union Congress is founded in Secunderabad, India.
  - The Kurdistan Democratic Party is founded in South Kurdistan.
- August 18 – The Vergarola explosion of ordnance in Croatia kills 70.
- August 30 – Bell's chief test pilot, Jack Woolams, dies in a plane crash while flying the P-39 "Cobra I" over Lake Ontario preparing for an air race the following day.

=== September ===
- September 1 – 1946 Turin Grand Prix, the first official Formula One Grand Prix, is held in Italy.
- September 2 – The Interim Government of India takes charge, with Jawaharlal Nehru as vice president, as part of the transition from the British Raj to full independence for India and Pakistan.
- September 4 – Street violence between Muslims and Hindus erupts in Bombay.
- September 5 – Gruber–De Gasperi Agreement signed between Austria and Italy to preserve the rights of the German-speaking population of South Tyrol within Italy.
- September 7 – First devaluation in Turkey: the lira loses 40% of its value.
- September 8 – Bulgaria is declared a People's Republic after a referendum; King Simeon II leaves.
- September 10 – Operation Black Tulip, the expulsion of Germans from the Netherlands, begins in Amsterdam.
- September 19 – The idea of the Council of Europe is introduced in a speech by Winston Churchill at the University of Zurich.
- September 24 – Cathay Pacific Airways is founded in Hong Kong, by American Roy Farrell and Australian Sydney de Kantzow.
- September 28
  - 1946 Australian federal election: Ben Chifley's Labor government is re-elected with a reduced majority, defeating the Liberal/Country Coalition led by former Prime Minister Robert Menzies. This is the first occasion where a Labor government successfully wins two elections in a row on a federal level, albeit with a swing against them; among the casualties are former Prime Minister Frank Forde. This is also the first election contested by the newly formed Liberal Party, which had replaced the United Australia Party as the main centre-right political party in Australia.
  - George II of Greece returns to Athens from exile in England.

=== October ===
- October 1 – Mensa, an international organization for people with a high intelligence quotient (IQ), is founded by Roland Berrill, an Australian-born lawyer, and Lancelot Ware, an English biochemist and lawyer, in Oxford.
- October 2 – Communists establish power in Bulgaria.
- October 6 – Sweden's Prime Minister Per Albin Hansson dies in office of a heart attack.
- October 10 – The Noakhali riots in Bengal begin: several hundred Hindus are massacred by Muslims.
- October 11 – After a few days of vacancy, the Swedish premiership is taken over by Tage Erlander.
- October 13 – France adopts the constitution of the Fourth Republic.
- October 14 – The International Organization for Standardization (ISO) is founded.
- October 15 – Nuremberg trials: Hermann Göring, founder of the Gestapo and recently convicted Nazi war criminal, poisons himself two hours before his scheduled execution.
- October 16
  - The remaining ten Nazi war criminals sentenced to death at the Nuremberg trials are executed by hanging, in a gymnasium in the Palace of Justice, Nuremberg.
  - The United Nations' first meeting in Long Island is held.
- October 23 – The United Nations General Assembly convenes for the first time, at an auditorium in Flushing, Queens, New York City.
- October 24–November 11 – 1946 Bihar riots: Hindu mobs target Muslim families in the Indian state of Bihar, resulting in anywhere between 2,000 and 30,000 deaths.

=== November ===
- November 4 – UNESCO (the United Nations Educational, Scientific and Cultural Organization) is established as a specialized agency of the United Nations.
- November 10 – At least 1,400 people are killed when the 6.8–7.0 Mw Ancash earthquake affects the Quiches District of Peru with a maximum Mercalli intensity of X (Extreme).
- November 12
  - A truce is declared between Indonesian nationalist troops and the Dutch army in Indonesia.
  - In Chicago, a branch of the Exchange National Bank (later part of the Bank of America) opens the first 10 drive-up teller windows.
- November 15 – By the Linggadjati Agreement, the Netherlands recognizes the Republic of Indonesia.
- November 19
  - Afghanistan, Iceland and Sweden join the United Nations.
  - 1946 Romanian general election: The Romanian Communist Party wins 79.86% of the vote, through widespread intimidation tactics and electoral fraud.
- November 23
  - Vietnamese riot in Haiphong and clash with French troops. In the Haiphong incident, the French cruiser Suffren opens fire, killing 6,000 Vietnamese.
  - The Workers' Party of South Korea is founded.
- November 27 – Indian Prime Minister Jawaharlal Nehru appeals to the United States and the Soviet Union to end nuclear testing and start nuclear disarmament, stating that such an action would "save humanity from the ultimate disaster."
- November 29 – The Central All-Indonesian Workers Organization (SOBSI) is founded in Jakarta.

=== December ===
- December 1 – Miguel Alemán Valdés takes office as President of Mexico.
- December 2 – The International Convention for the Regulation of Whaling is signed in Washington, D.C., to "provide for the proper conservation of whale stocks and thus make possible the orderly development of the whaling industry" through establishment of the International Whaling Commission.
- December 7 – The Winecoff Hotel fire in Atlanta, United States, kills 119.
- December 10 – John Peters Humphrey, main author of the Universal Declaration of Human Rights, becomes Director of the United Nations Division of Human Rights.
- December 11 – UNICEF (the United Nations International Children's Emergency Fund) is founded.
- December 12
  - The United Nations severs relations with Francoist Spain and recommends that member countries sever diplomatic relations.
  - Léon Blum founds a government of socialist parties in France.
  - Iran crisis of 1946: Iranian troops recapture the Azerbaijan province.
- December 14
  - The International Labour Organization becomes a specialized agency of the United Nations.
  - Proposed United States purchase of Greenland from Denmark: An offer is made through diplomatic channels.
  - Aspen Skiing Company opens Aspen Mountain (ski area) in Colorado with Ski Lift No. 1, at 7,980 ft (2.43 km) the world's longest chairlift at this time.
- December 15
  - The first French India Representative Assembly election is held.
  - Iran crisis of 1946: Iranian troops recapture the Kurdish Republic of Mahabad.
- December 16 – Siam joins the United Nations (changes its name to Thailand in 1949).
- December 19 – Viet Minh forces begin a war against French occupying forces in Vietnam, succeeding in 1954 with France's surrender at the Battle of Dien Bien Phu.
- December 20 – Film It's a Wonderful Life is released in the United States; it becomes an enduring classic.
- December 21 – 1946 Nankai earthquake: At least 1,362 people are killed in an earthquake and associated tsunami in Japan.
- December 22 – The Havana Conference begins between U.S. organized crime bosses in Havana, Cuba.
- December 24 – The French Fourth Republic is founded.
- December 25 – The first artificial, self-sustaining nuclear chain reaction in Europe is initiated, within the Soviet (Russian) nuclear reactor F-1.
- December 31 – U.S. President Harry S. Truman delivers Proclamation 2714, which officially ends hostilities in World War II.

=== Date unknown ===
- Cancelled 1946 FIFA World Cup.
- Female suffrage is enacted in Romania, Yugoslavia, Argentina and the Canadian province of Quebec.
- The first female police officers are hired in Korea and Japan.
- The Chinese Civil War intensifies between the Kuomintang and the Chinese Communist Party.
- Eva Perón tours Spain, Italy and France on behalf of Argentina, a circuit called the Rainbow Tour.
- The 20 mm M61 Vulcan Gatling gun contract is released.
- The Casio company is founded by engineer Tadao Kashio in Japan.
- The Magic 8 Ball is invented by Albert C. Carter and Abe Bookman.

== Births ==
=== January ===
- January 1
  - Alfonso Caruana, Italian mobster
  - Rivellino, Brazilian football player
- January 3
  - John Paul Jones, English rock bassist (Led Zeppelin, Them Crooked Vultures)
  - Cissy King, American dancer, singer
- January 4
  - Diana Ewing, American actress
  - Lisa Appignanesi, Polish-born British-Canadian writer, novelist, and campaigner for free expression
- January 5 – Diane Keaton, American actress, film director (Annie Hall) (d. 2025)
- January 6 – Syd Barrett, English rock guitarist, singer and songwriter (Pink Floyd) (d. 2006)
- January 8 – Robby Krieger, American rock musician (The Doors)
- January 9
  - Levon Ter-Petrosyan, President of Armenia
  - Mogens Lykketoft, Danish politician
- January 10
  - Kalidas Karmakar, Bangladeshi artist
  - Ha Yu, Hong Kong actor
- January 12 – George Duke, African-American musician (d. 2013)
- January 14
  - Feró Nagy, Hungarian singer
  - Harold Shipman, British serial killer (d. 2004)
- January 16
  - Kabir Bedi, Indian actor
  - Michael Coats, American astronaut
  - Katia Ricciarelli, Italian singer
- January 17 – Frank Bey, American blues singer (d. 2020)
- January 18
  - Paul Shmyr, Canadian National Hockey League player (d. 2004)
  - Joseph Deiss, Swiss Federal Councillor
- January 19
  - Julian Barnes, English novelist
  - Dolly Parton, American singer-songwriter, actress, businesswoman and philanthropist (d. 2026)
- January 20 – David Lynch, American film director (d. 2025)
- January 22
  - Malcolm McLaren, English singer-songwriter, musician and music manager (d. 2010)
  - Serge Savard, Canadian hockey player, executive
- January 23 – Arnoldo Alemán, President of Nicaragua
- January 24 – Michael Ontkean, Canadian actor (The Rookies)
- January 25 – Géza Bereményi, Hungarian writer, screenwriter and film director
- January 26
  - Gene Siskel, American film critic (Sneak Previews) (d. 1999)
  - Michel Delpech, French singer-songwriter and actor (d. 2016)
- January 27 – Nedra Talley, African-American singer (The Ronettes)
- January 29 – Bettye LaVette, African-American soul singer-songwriter
- January 30 – John Bird, Baron Bird, British social entrepreneur and life peer
- January 31 – Terry Kath, American rock musician (Chicago) (d. 1978)

=== February ===
  - Elisabeth Sladen, English actress (d. 2011)
  - Pascal Bonitzer, French screenwriter, film director, actor and film critic
- February 2
  - Isaias Afwerki, President of Eritrea
  - Blake Clark, American actor, comedian
- February 4 – Ron Anderson, American vocal coach and opera singer (d. 2021)
- February 5 – Charlotte Rampling, British actress
- February 6
  - Kate McGarrigle, Canadian singer-songwriter (d. 2010)
  - Jim Turner, American politician
- February 7
  - Sammy Johns, American country music singer-songwriter (d. 2013)
  - Pete Postlethwaite, English actor (d. 2011)
  - Héctor Babenco, Argentine-Brazilian film director, screenwriter, producer and actor (d. 2016)
- February 9 – Seán Neeson, Northern Irish politician
- February 10 – Dick Anderson, American professional football player
- February 13
  - Joe Estevez, American actor
  - Colin Matthews, British composer
  - Richard Blumenthal, American lawyer and politician
- February 14
  - Bernard Dowiyogo, 7-time President of Nauru (d. 2003)
  - Tina Aumont, American actress (d. 2006)
  - Gregory Hines, African-American dancer, actor (d. 2003)
- February 16 – Marvin Sease, American blues and soul singer-songwriter (d. 2011)
- February 18 – Michael Buerk, British journalist and newsreader
- February 19 – Karen Silkwood, American activist (d. 1974)
- February 20
  - Brenda Blethyn, British actress
  - Sandy Duncan, American singer, dancer, comedian and actress
  - J. Geils, American guitarist (The J. Geils Band) (d. 2017)
- February 21
  - Alan Rickman, English actor, film director (d. 2016)
  - Anthony Daniels, English actor
  - Vito Rizzuto, Italian-Canadian mobster (d. 2013)
  - Monica Johnson, American screenwriter (d. 2010)
  - Tyne Daly, American actress (Cagney & Lacey)
- February 23 – Allan Boesak, South African Dutch Reformed Church cleric, politician and anti-apartheid activist
- February 24 – Jiří Bělohlávek, Czech orchestral conductor (d. 2017)
- February 25
  - Andrew Ang, judge of the Supreme Court of Singapore
  - Franz Xaver Kroetz, German dramatist
  - Jean Todt, French motorsport manager
  - Elkie Brooks, English rock, blues and jazz singer
- February 26
  - Ahmed Zewail, Egyptian-born chemist, Nobel Prize laureate (d. 2016)
  - Colin Bell, English footballer (d. 2021)
- February 27
  - Alexandra Hamilton, Duchess of Abercorn, British aristocrat (d. 2018)
  - Jaroslav Beneš, Czech photographer
- February 28
  - Don Ciccone, American singer-songwriter (The Critters) (d. 2016)
  - Robin Cook, British politician (d. 2005)
  - Don Francisco, American Christian musician
  - Syreeta Wright, African-American singer-songwriter ("With You I'm Born Again") (d. 2004)

=== March ===
- March 1
  - Jan Kodeš, Czech tennis player
  - Lana Wood, American actress, producer
  - Tony Ashton, English rock pianist, keyboardist, singer, composer, producer and artist (d. 2001)
- March 2 – Morari Bapu, Hindu Kathakaar
- March 3 – James C. Adamson, NASA astronaut
- March 4
  - Michael Ashcroft, English entrepreneur
  - Haile Gerima, Ethiopian filmmaker
  - Harvey Goldsmith, British impresario
- March 5
  - Murray Head, English singer, actor
  - Lova Moor, French singer, dancer
  - Rocky Bleier, American professional football player and veteran
  - Richard A. Sofio, American politician, member of the Michigan House of Representatives from 1987 to 1990 (d. 2009)
- March 6
  - Larry Huber, American television producer, animator
  - David Gilmour, English rock musician (Pink Floyd)
- March 7
  - John Heard, American actor (d. 2017)
  - Okko Kamu, Finnish conductor, violinist
  - Leandro Mendoza, Filipino politician (d. 2013)
  - Peter Wolf, American rock musician (The J. Geils Band)
- March 9
  - Steve Ashley, English singer-songwriter, recording artist, multi-instrumentalist, writer and graphic designer
  - Alexandra Bastedo, British actress (d. 2014)
- March 10 – Mike Hollands, Australian animator
- March 12
  - Frank Welker, American voice actor, singer
  - Liza Minnelli, American singer, actress
- March 13
  - Yonatan Netanyahu, American-born Israeli Army officer (d. in Operation Entebbe) (d. 1976)
  - Yann Arthus-Bertrand, French environmentalist, activist, journalist and photographer
- March 14
  - Álvaro Arzú, 32nd President of Guatemala (d. 2018)
  - Wes Unseld, American basketball player (d. 2020)
  - Mieke Bal, Dutch cultural theorist, video artist and professor
  - Molana Azizullah Bohio, Pakistani religious scholar and politician (d. 2021)
- March 15 – Bobby Bonds, American baseball player, manager (d. 2003)
- March 16 – Sigmund Groven, Norwegian classical harmonica player
- March 17 – Georges J. F. Köhler, German biologist, recipient of the Nobel Prize in Physiology or Medicine (d. 1995)
- March 18 – Larry Langford, American politician (d. 2019)
- March 19
  - Steve Halliwell, English actor (d. 2023)
  - Paul Atkinson, British guitarist and record company executive (d. 2004)
- March 21 – Timothy Dalton, Welsh actor
- March 23 – Qamaruzzaman Azmi, Indian Islamic scholar, philosopher and speaker, president of the World Islamic Mission
- March 25
  - Cliff Balsom, English footballer
  - Stewart W. Bainum Jr., American businessman and politician
- March 26 – Gil Carlos Rodríguez Iglesias, Spanish judge (d. 2019)
- March 27
  - Andy Bown, British singer, songwriter, musician (The Herd, solo, Status Quo)
  - Mike Jackson, American baseball pitcher
  - Miklós Lukáts, Hungarian politician (d. 2022)
- March 28
  - Henry Paulson, 74th US Treasury Secretary
  - Alejandro Toledo, 63rd President of Peru
- March 29
  - Segun Bucknor, Nigerian musician, journalist (d. 2017)
  - Billy Thorpe, English-born Australian singer-songwriter (d. 2007)
- March 30 – Carolyn Simpson, judge of the Supreme Court of New South Wales
- March 31
  - Gonzalo Márquez, Venezuelan Major League Baseball player (d. 1984)
  - F'Murr, French comics artist (d. 2018)

=== April ===
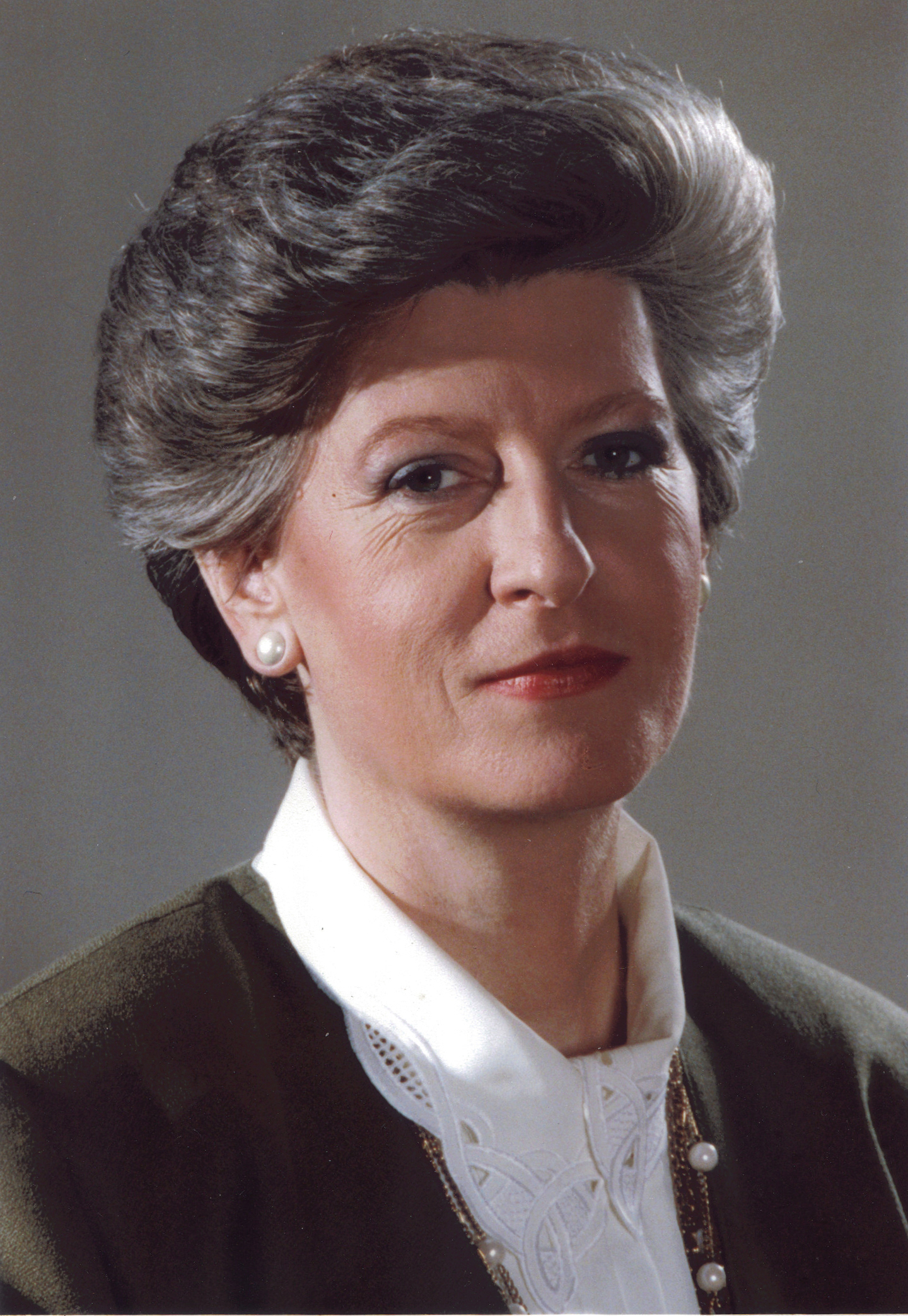
Hanna Suchocka

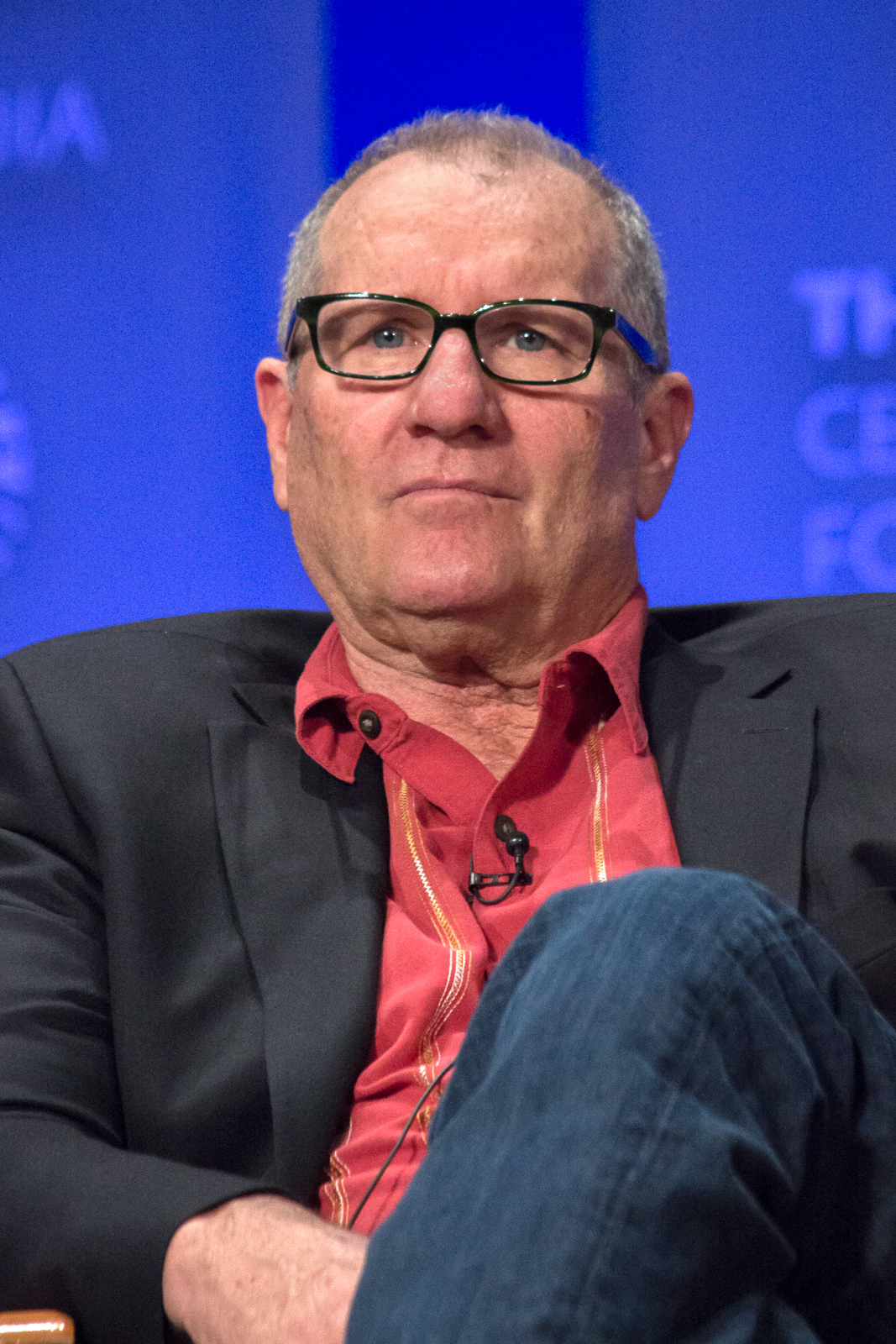
Ed O'Neill

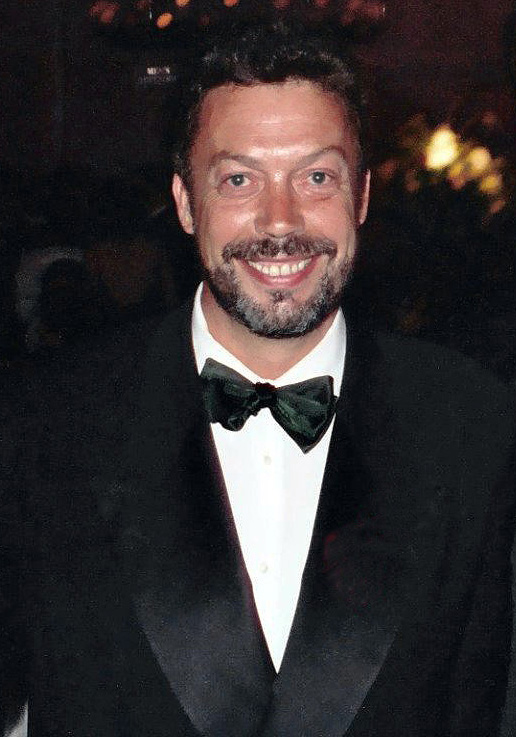
Tim Curry

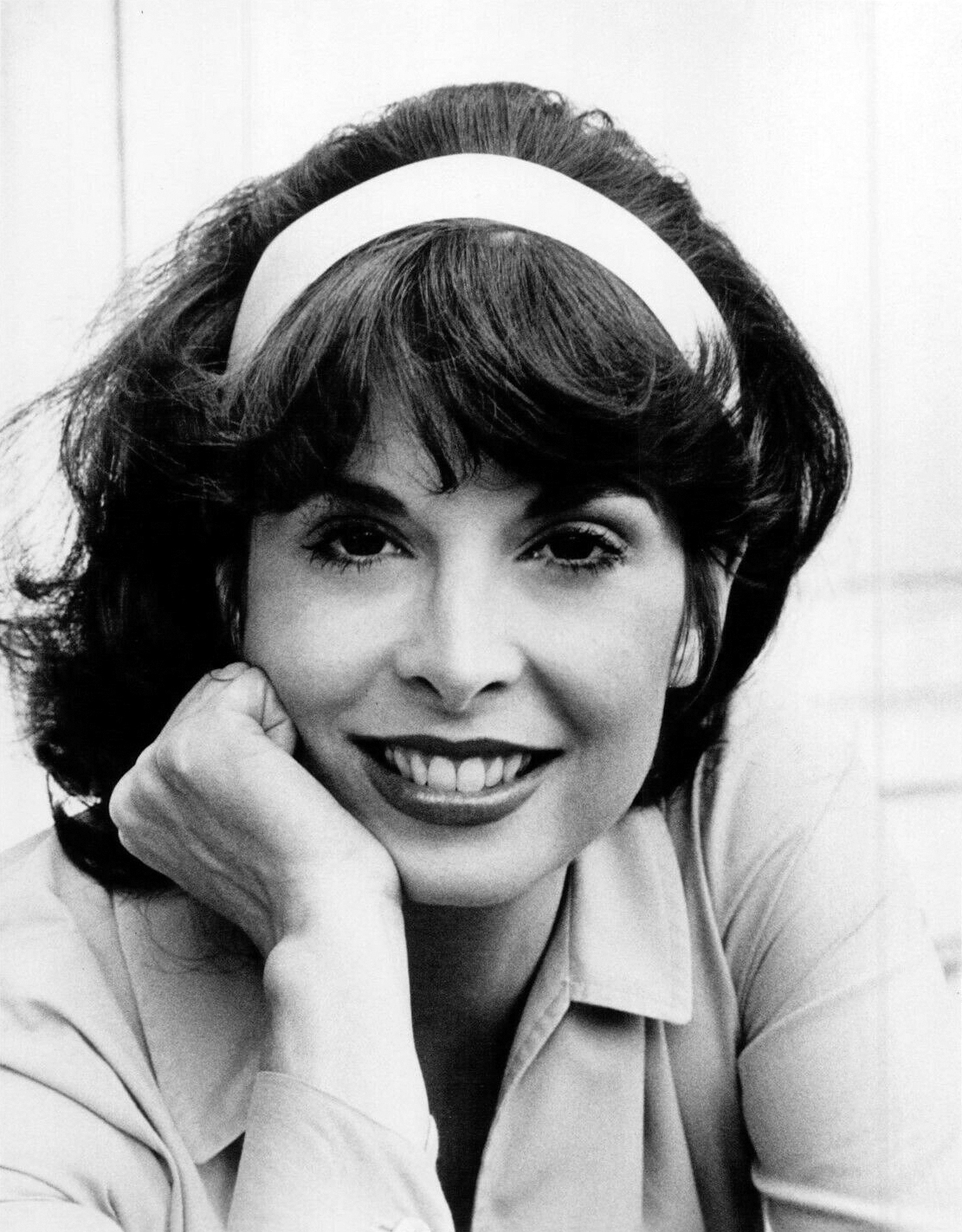
Talia Shire

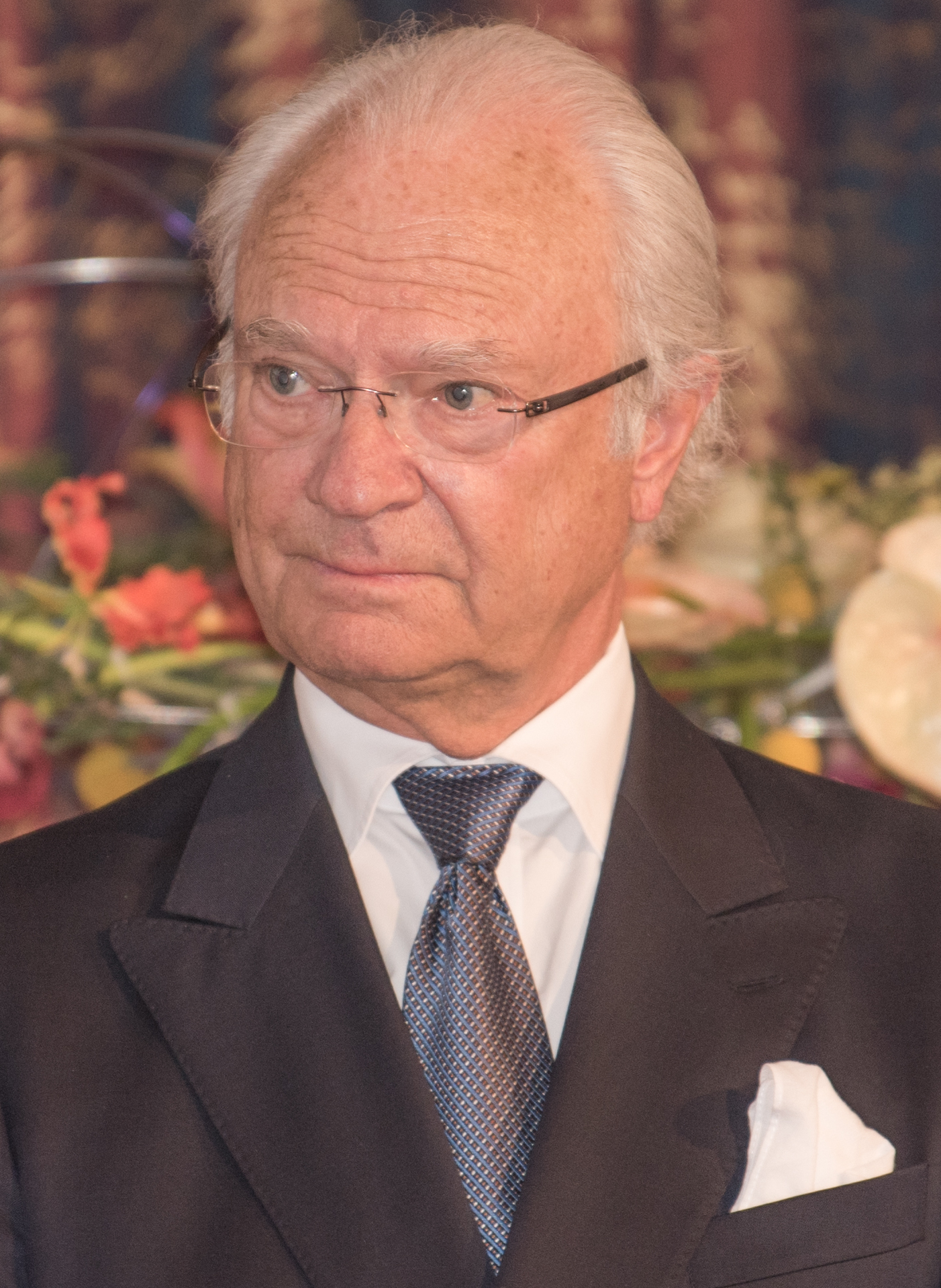
Carl XVI Gustaf

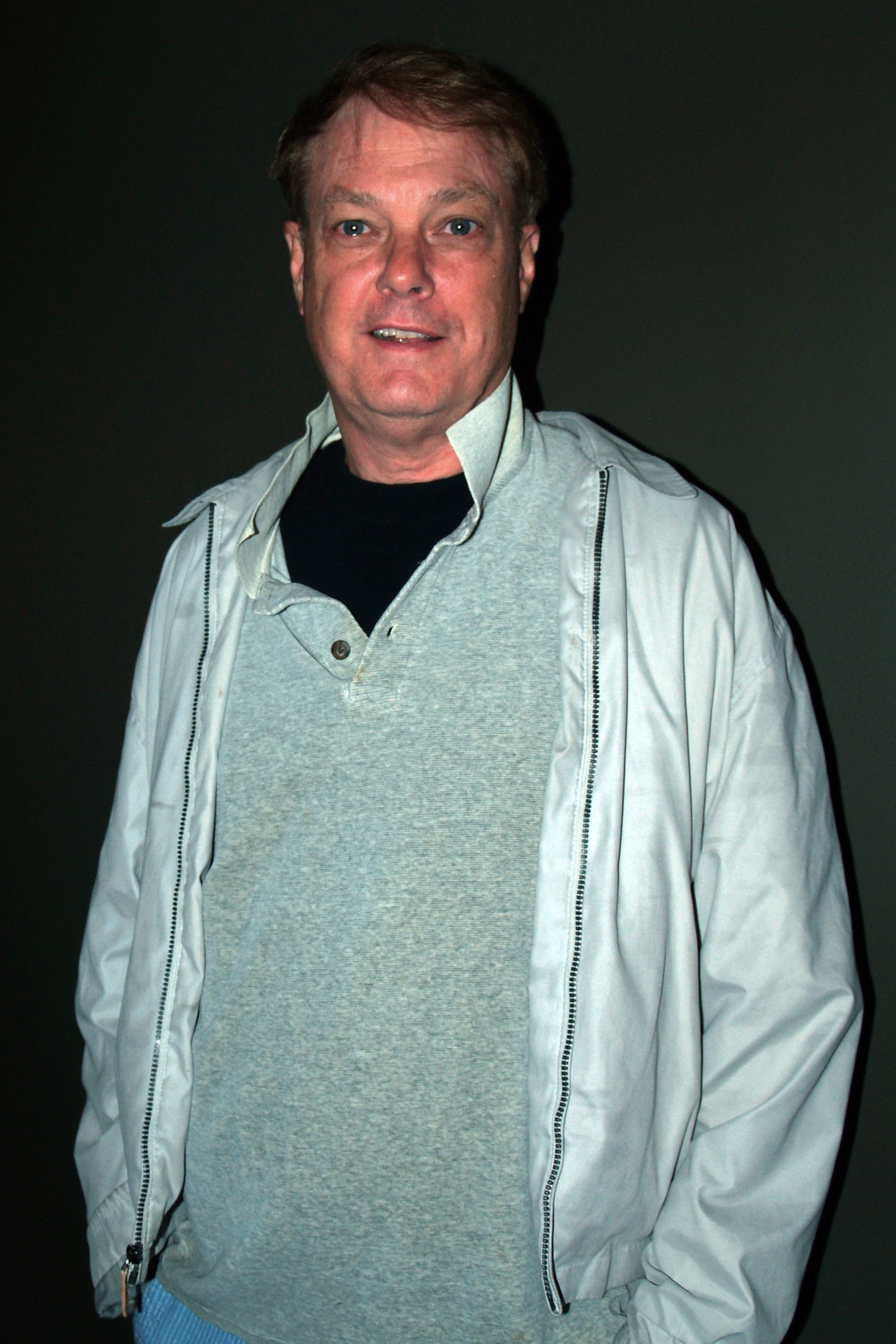
Bill Plympton

- April 1 – Ronnie Lane, English musician (Small Faces, Faces) (d. 1997)
- April 2
  - Hamengkubuwono X, Sultan of the historic Yogyakarta Sultanate in Indonesia, Governor of Yogyakarta Special Region
  - Beno Axionov, Russian-Moldovan actor, director, drama teacher and screenwriter
- April 3 – Hanna Suchocka, Prime Minister of Poland
- April 4 – Dave Hill, English guitarist (Slade)
- April 5
  - Jane Asher, English actress
  - János Bródy, Hungarian singer, guitarist, composer and songwriter
  - Björn Granath, Swedish actor (d. 2017)
- April 6 – Paul Beresford, British-New Zealander politician
- April 7
  - Colette Besson, French track and field athlete (d. 2005)
  - Léon Krier, Luxembourgish architect
  - Zaid Abdul-Aziz, American professional basketball player
- April 8
  - Catfish Hunter, American baseball player (d. 1999)
  - Tim Thomerson, American actor and comedian
- April 10 – David Angell, American television producer (d. 2001)
- April 11
- Chris Burden, American artist (d. 2015)
- Bob Harris, British radio presenter
- Nicholas Ball, British actor (d. 2024)
- April 12 – Ed O'Neill, American actor (Married... with Children)
- April 13 – Al Green, African-American singer-songwriter and record producer
- April 15 – Marsha Hunt, American actress, singer and novelist
- April 16 – Margot Adler, American journalist
- April 18 – Hayley Mills, English actress
- April 19 – Tim Curry, British actor, voice artist and singer (The Rocky Horror Picture Show) (d. 2026)
- April 20
  - Julien Poulin, Canadian actor (d. 2025)
  - Ricardo Maduro, President of Honduras
- April 22
  - John Waters, American film director
  - Paul Davies, English physicist
  - Allahverdi Baghirov, (d. 1992) Azerbaijani officer, leader of the Azerbaijani Popular Front Party of Agdam and head coach of Qarabağ FK
- April 23
  - Rosy Afsari, Bangladeshi actress (d. 2007)
  - Blair Brown, American actress
- April 24
  - Phil Robertson, American businessman and reality television personality (d. 2025)
  - Kamla Bhasin, Indian developmental feminist activist, poet, author and social scientist (d. 2021)
  - Ronnie Bird, French singer
- April 25
  - John Fox, British statistician
  - Talia Shire, American actress (Rocky)
  - Strobe Talbott, American journalist
  - Vladimir Zhirinovsky, Russian politician (d. 2022)
- April 26
  - Jennie Stoller, British actress (d. 2018)
  - Richard S. Fuld Jr., American banker
- April 28
  - Nour El-Sherif, Egyptian actor (d. 2015)
  - Beverly Bivens, American singer (We Five)
- April 29
  - Franc Roddam, English film director, businessman, screenwriter, television producer and publisher
  - Cliven Bundy, American cattle rancher
- April 30
  - King Carl XVI Gustaf of Sweden
  - Bill Plympton, American animator, graphic designer, cartoonist and filmmaker
  - Lee Bollinger, American attorney and educator

=== May ===
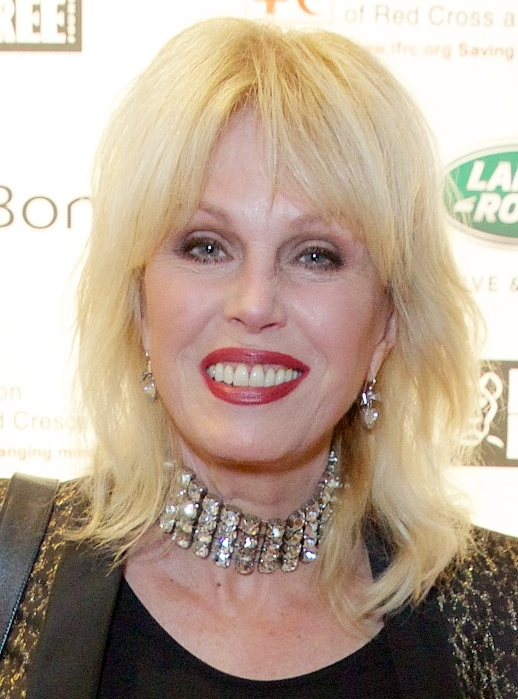
Dame Joanna Lumley

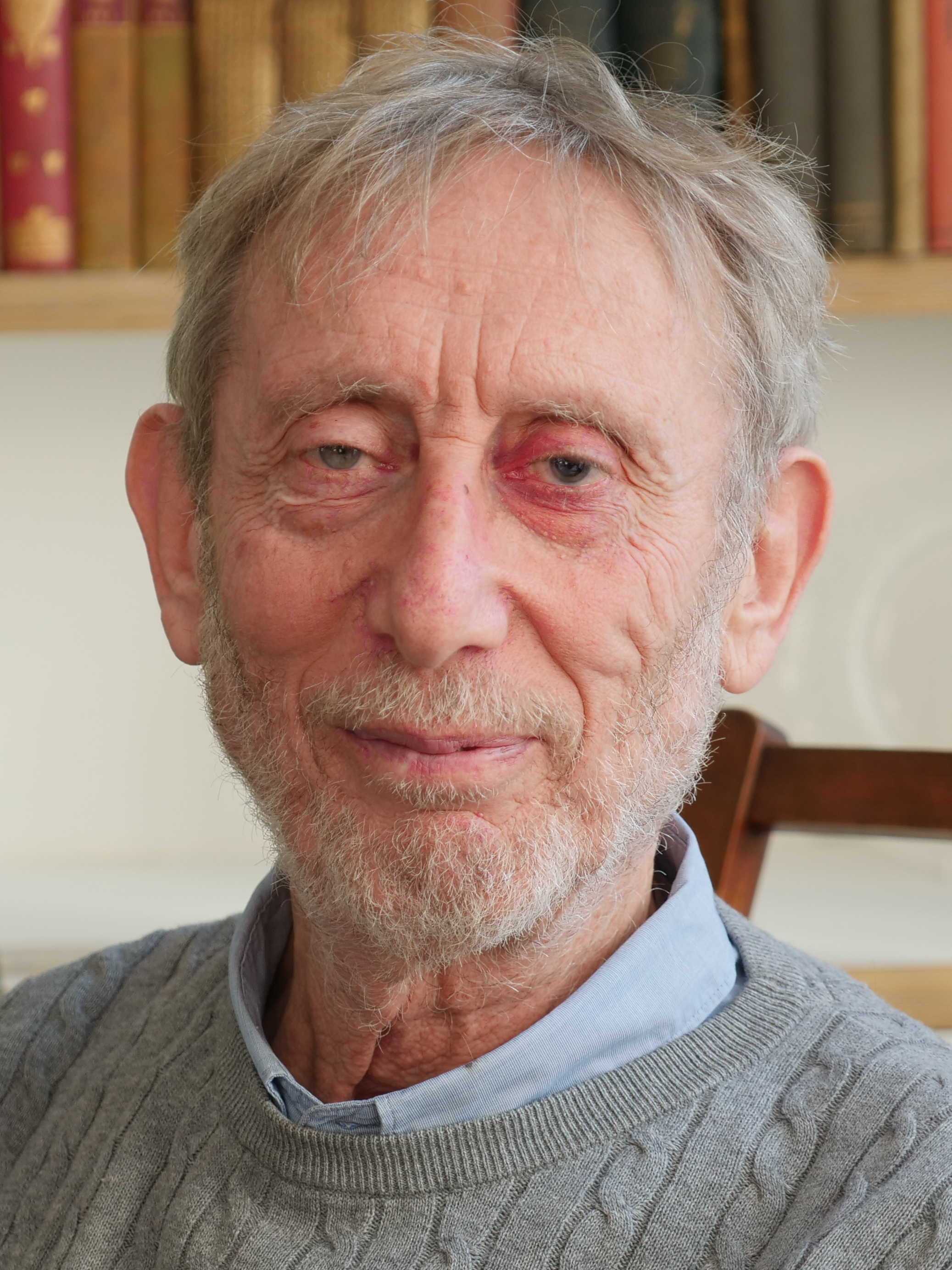
Michael Rosen

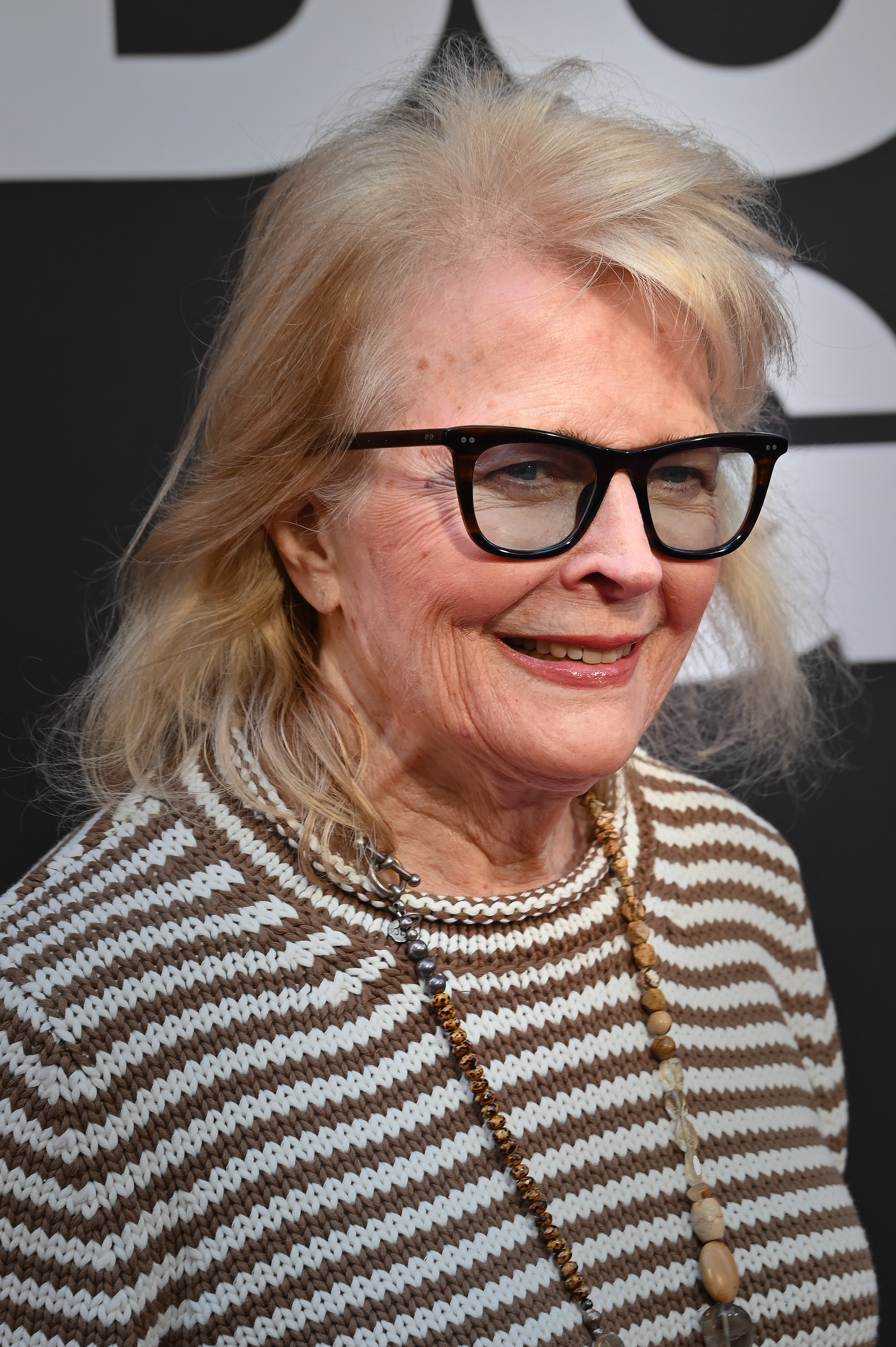
Candice Bergen

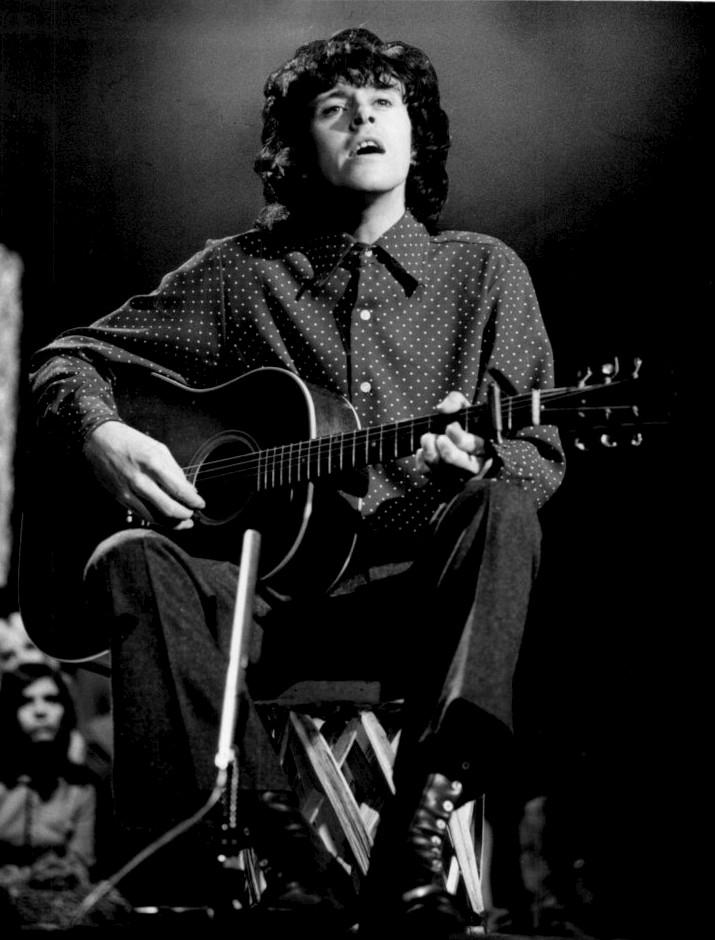
Donovan

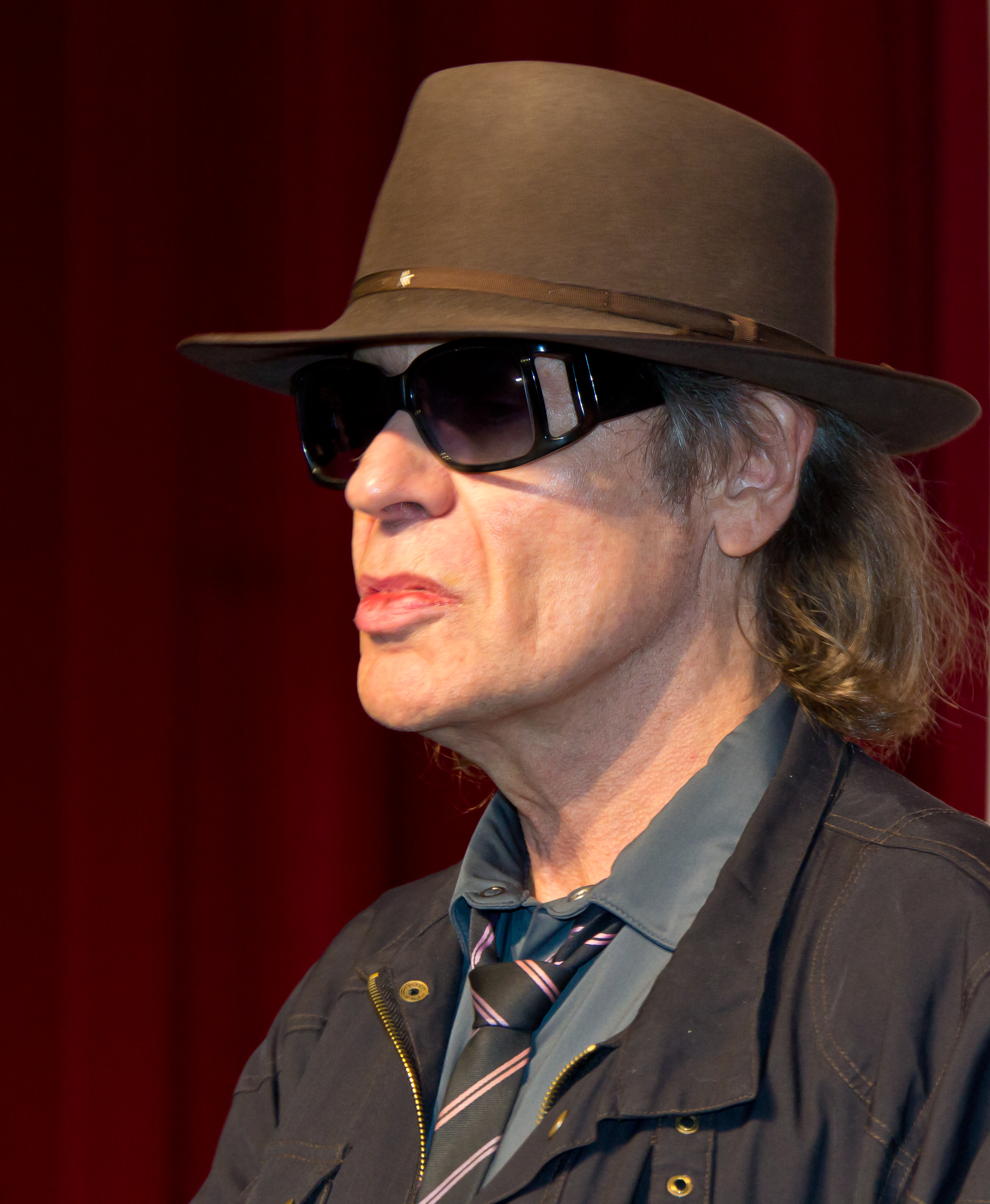
Udo Lindenberg

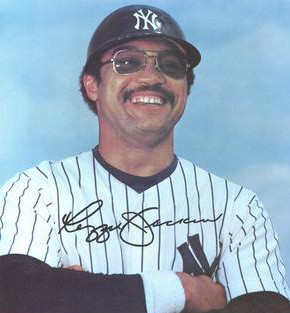
Reggie Jackson

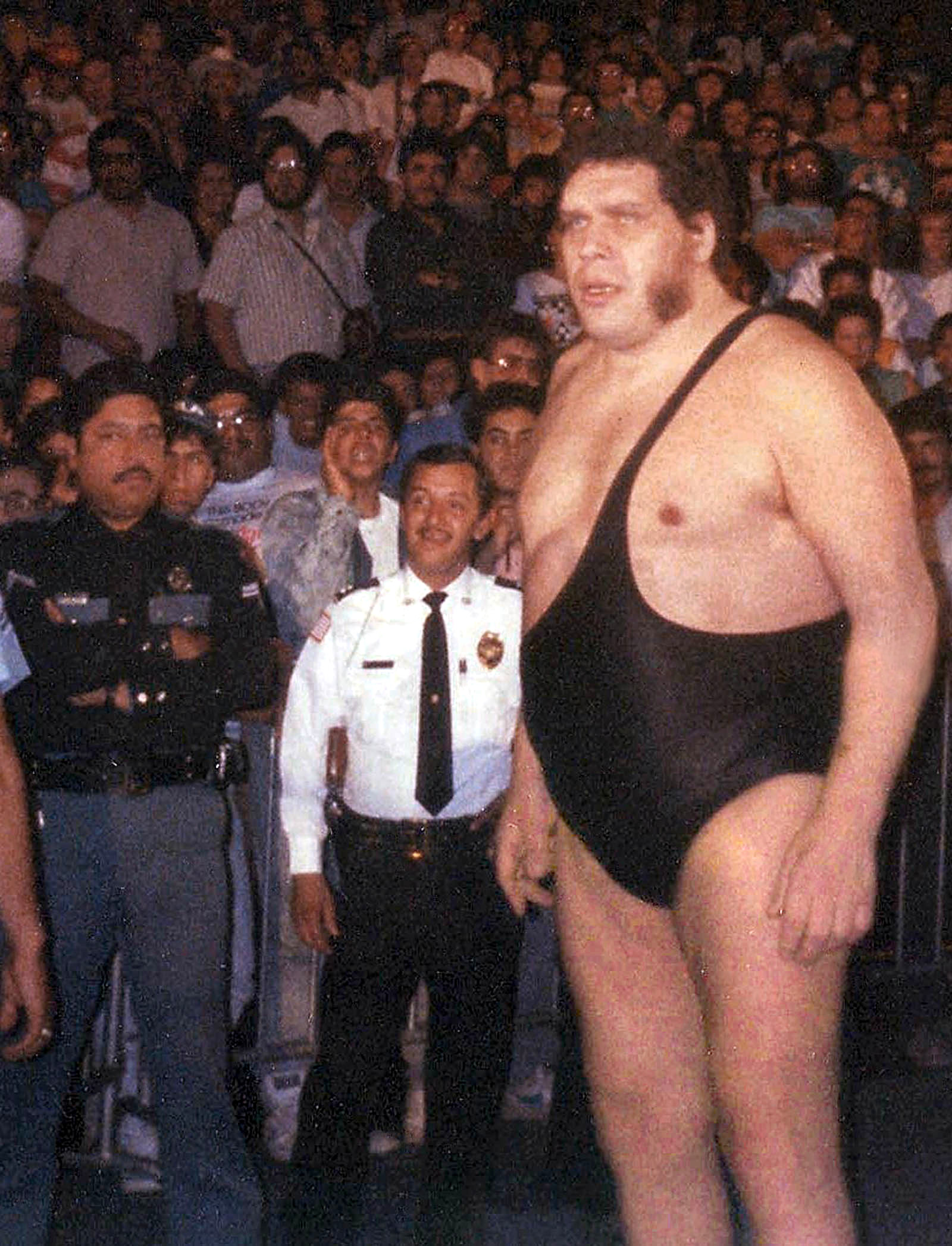
André the Giant

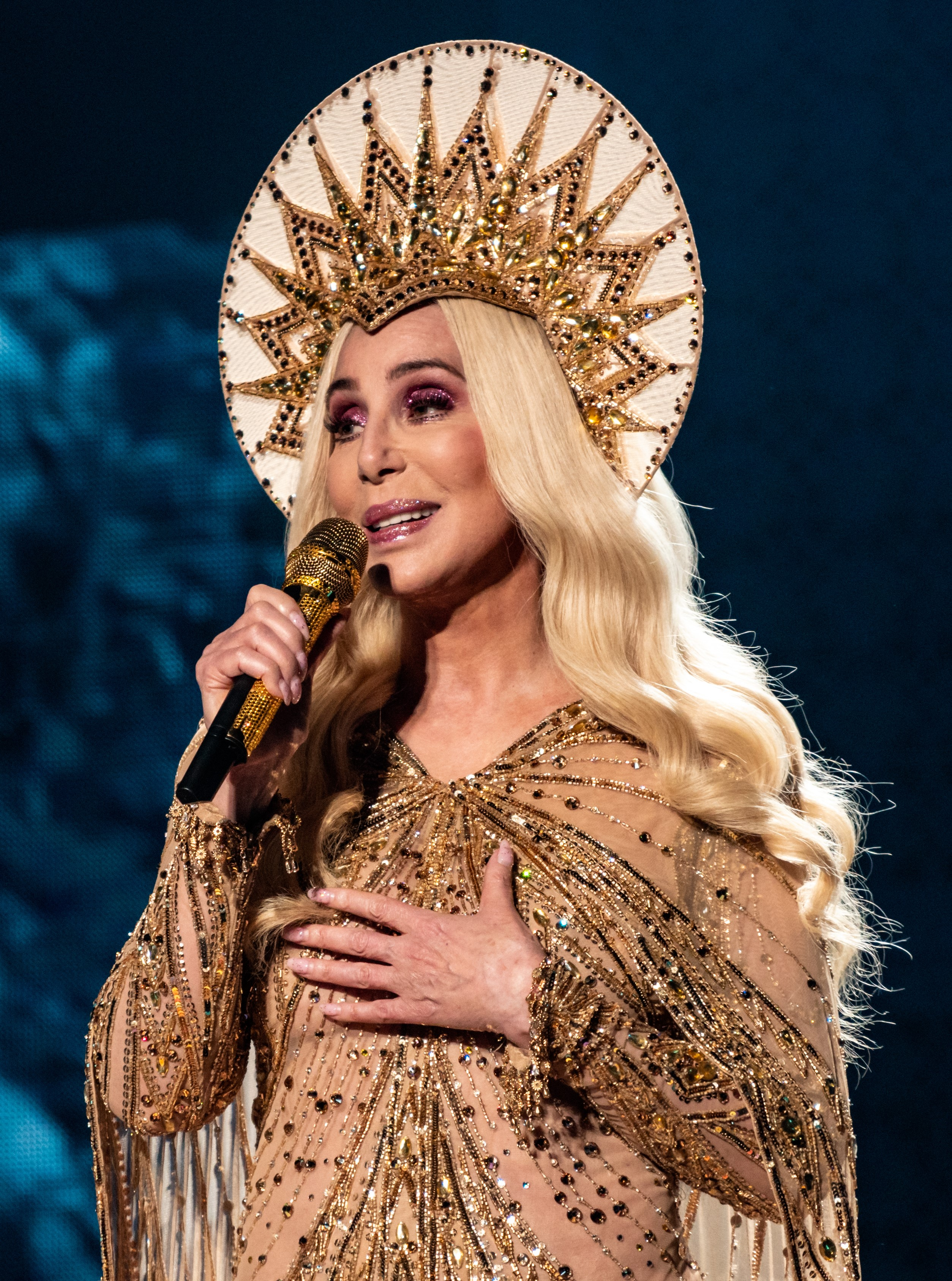
Cher

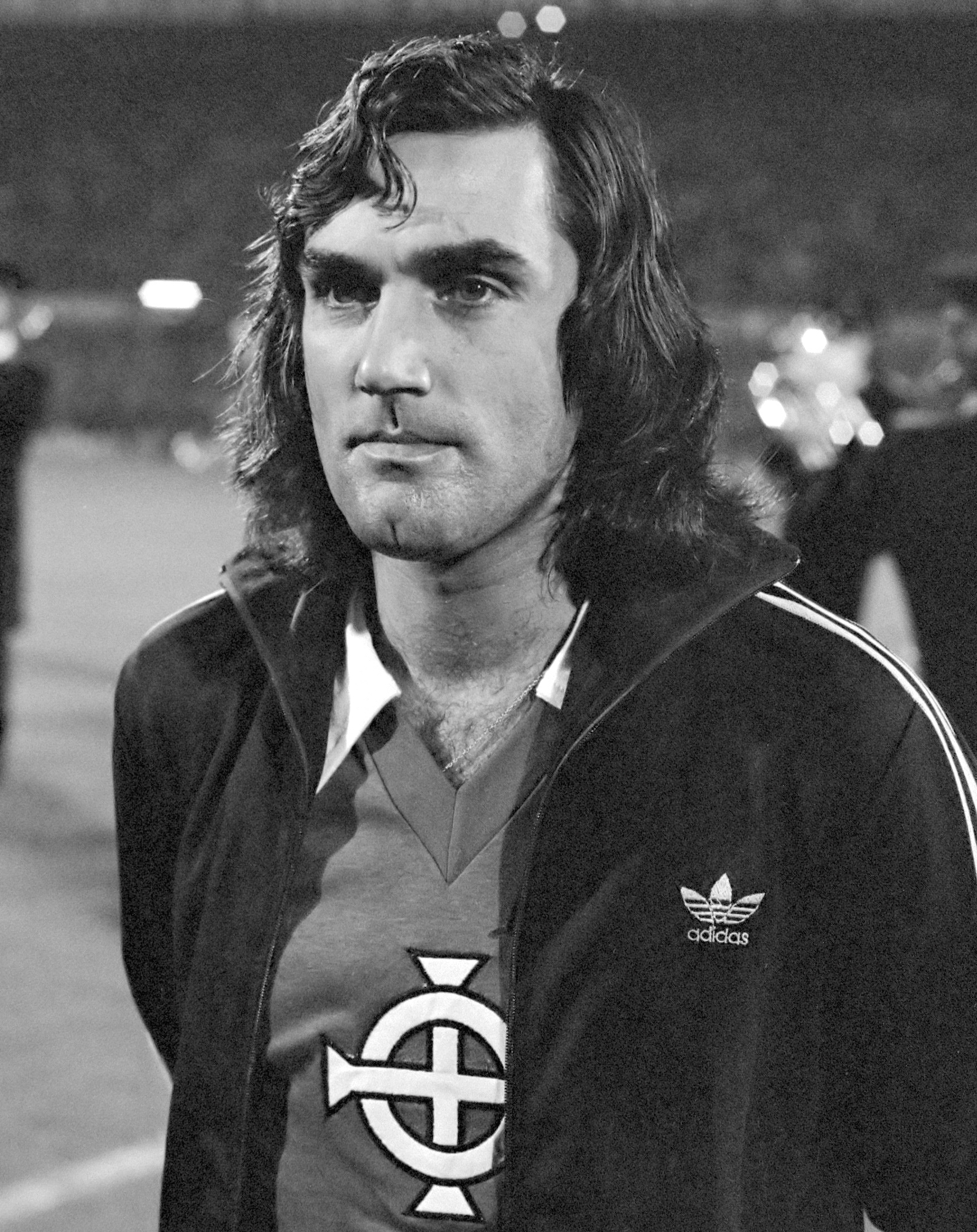
George Best

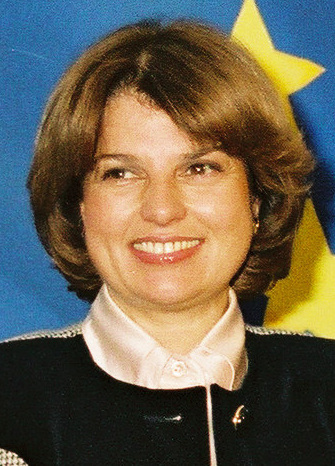
Tansu Çiller

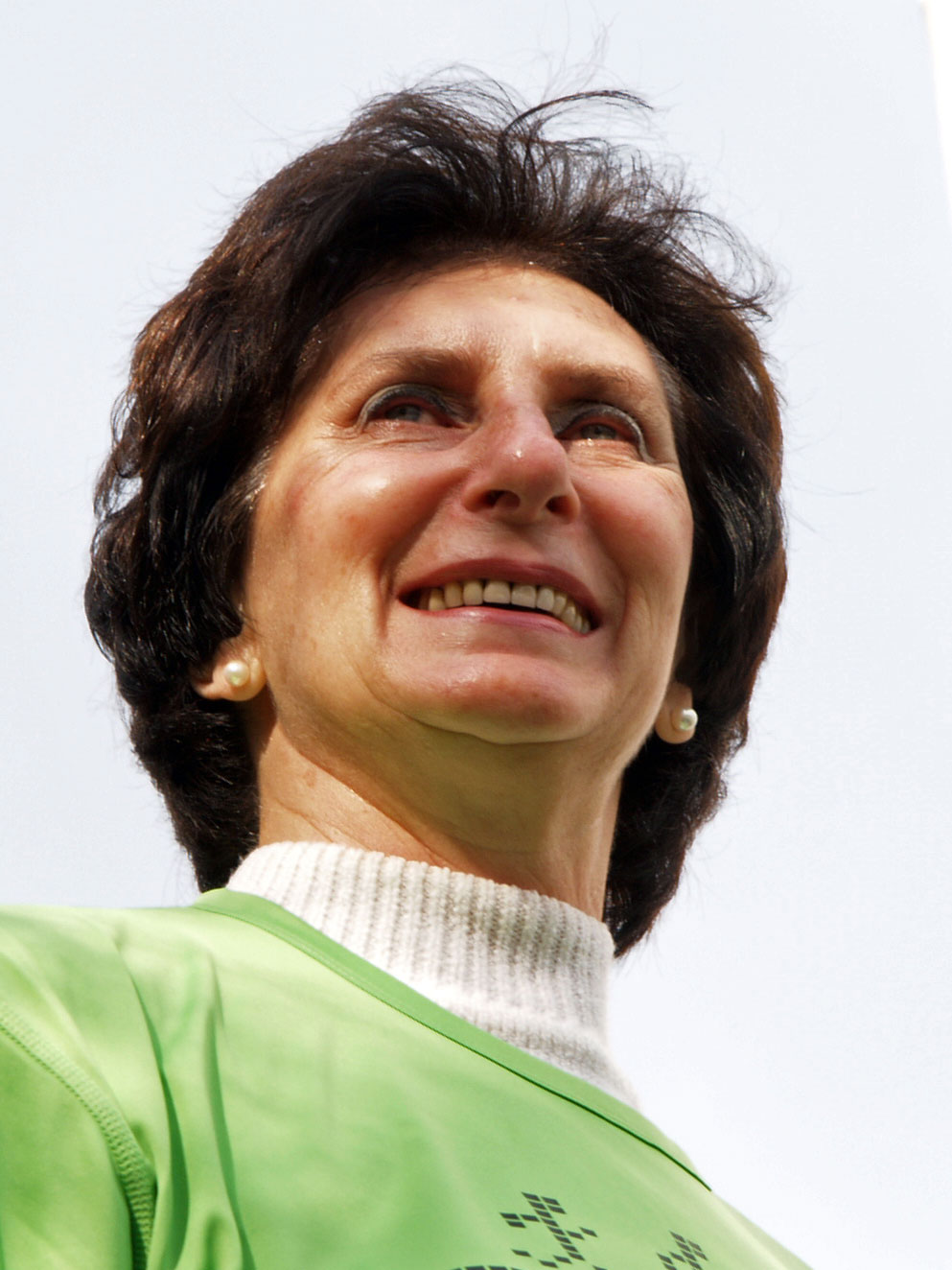
Irena Szewińska

- May 1 – Joanna Lumley, English actress, author
- May 2
  - Lesley Gore, American rock singer ("It's My Party") (d. 2015)
  - Ralf Gothóni, Finnish pianist, conductor and composer
- May 3 – Mohammed Ibrahim, Sudanese-British businessman and philanthropist
- May 4
  - John Watson, Northern Irish racecar driver
  - John Barnard, English engineer and racing car designer
  - Gary Bauer, American civil servant, activist and politician
- May 5
  - Jim Kelly, African-American actor, martial artist and tennis player (d. 2013)
  - Kebby Musokotwane, Prime Minister of Zambia (d. 1996)
  - Beth Carvalho, Brazilian samba singer, guitarist and composer (d. 2019)
  - Eddie Aikau, Hawaiian lifeguard and surfer (d. 1978)
- May 6
  - Daouda Malam Wanké, 6th President of Niger (d. 2004)
  - Susan Brown, English actress
- May 7
  - Bill Kreutzmann, American drummer (Grateful Dead)
  - Michael Rosen, British poet and children's author
- May 9
  - Candice Bergen, American actress
  - Yoel Bin-Nun, Israeli religious Zionist rabbi, a founder of Yeshivat Har Etzion, Gush Emunim, Michlelet Herzog, Alon Shevut and Ofra
- May 10
  - Donovan, Scottish rock musician
  - Birutė Galdikas, Canadian anthropologist, primatologist, conservationist, ethologist and author
  - Graham Gouldman, English songwriter, musician (10cc, Wax)
  - Dave Mason, English rock musician (Traffic) (d. 2026)
  - Murade Isaac Murargy, Mozambican diplomat, politician
- May 11
  - Robert Jarvik, American physicist, artificial heart inventor (d. 2025)
  - Ana Amado, Argentine journalist, filmmaker, academic and feminist (d. 2016)
- May 12 – Richard Bruce Silverman, John Evans Professor of Chemistry at Northwestern University
- May 13
  - Tim Pigott-Smith, English actor, author (d. 2017)
  - Basil Al Bayati, Iraqi-born architect and designer
- May 14
  - Claudia Goldin, American economic historian, recipient of the Nobel Memorial Prize in Economic Sciences
  - Paul Broun, American physician and politician
  - Elmar Brok, German politician
- May 15 – Aly Bain, Scottish fiddler
- May 16
  - Robert Fripp, British progressive rock guitarist, composer and producer
  - Olav Anton Thommessen, Norwegian composer
- May 17 – Udo Lindenberg, German musician
- May 18
  - Reggie Jackson, American baseball player
  - Andreas Katsulas, American actor (d. 2006)
  - Ken Kwaku, Ghanaian corporate governance expert
- May 19
  - André the Giant, French professional wrestler and actor (d. 1993)
  - Claude Lelièvre, Belgian Commissioner for Children Rights
  - Roger Sloman, English actor
  - Carlos Alberto de Barros Franco, Brazilian physician and professor
- May 20
  - Craig Patrick, American-Canadian hockey player, coach and manager
  - Cher, American actress, rock singer
- May 22
  - George Best, Northern Irish footballer (d. 2005)
  - Howard Kendall, English footballer (d. 2015)
- May 23
  - Frederik de Groot, Dutch actor
  - Gary Barnett, American football player and coach
- May 24
  - Tansu Çiller, Turkish politician, Prime Minister of Turkey
  - Irena Szewińska, Polish Olympic sprinter (d. 2018)
  - Nicolau dos Reis Lobato, East Timorese politician, acting President of East Timor (d. 1978)
  - Jackie Berroyer, French actor, comedian and writer
- May 26 – Mick Ronson, English guitarist (d. 1993)
- May 27 – Alma Adams, American politician
- May 28
  - Bruce Alexander, English actor
  - K. Satchidanandan, Malayalam poet
- May 29 – Fernando Buesa, Basque politician (d. 2000)
- May 30
  - Dragan Džajić, Serbian footballer
  - Candy Lightner, American founder of Mothers Against Drunk Driving
  - Jan de Bie, Dutch painter and photographer (d. 2021)
- May 31 – Adriana Bittel, Romanian writer

=== June ===
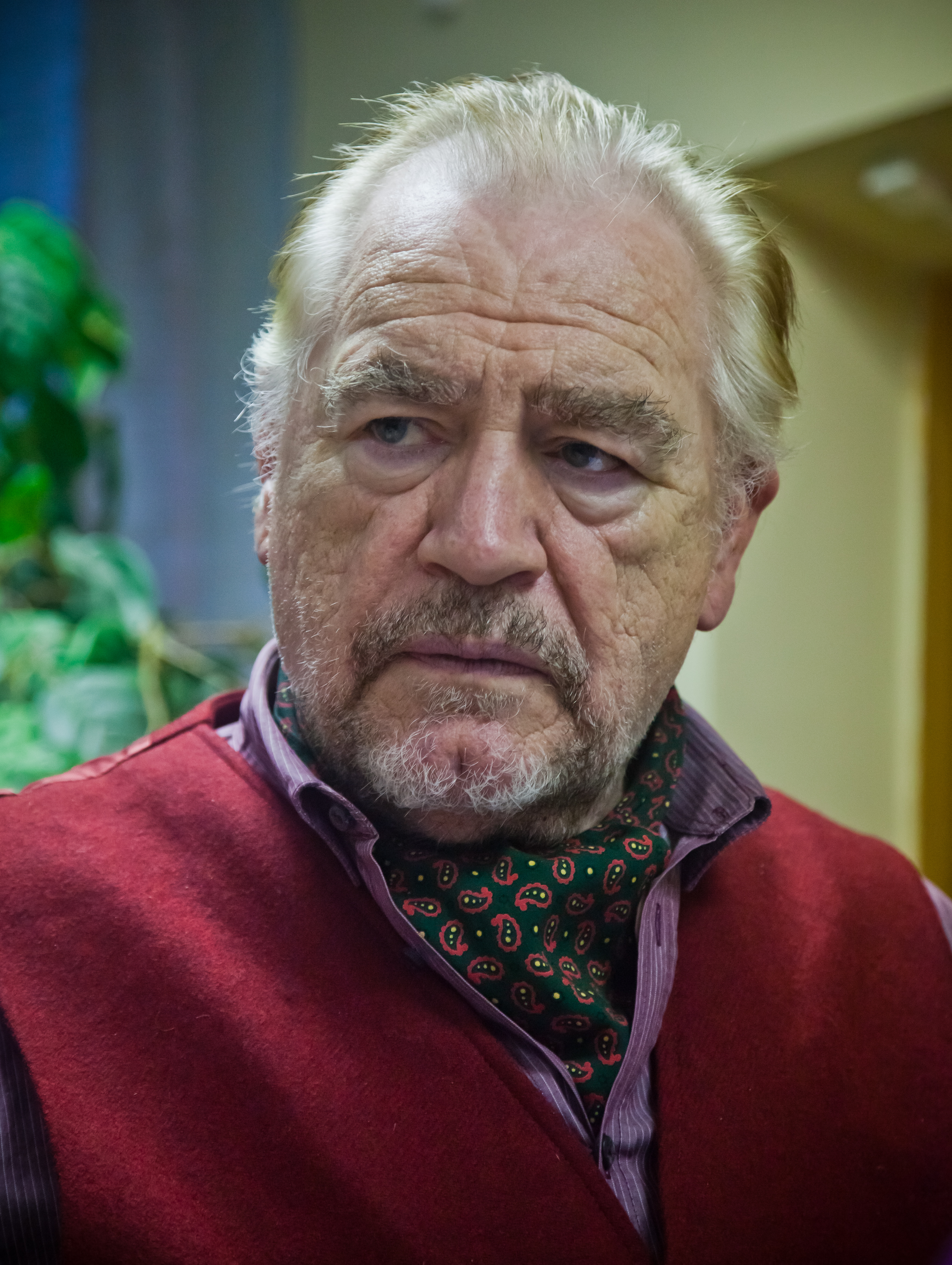
Brian Cox

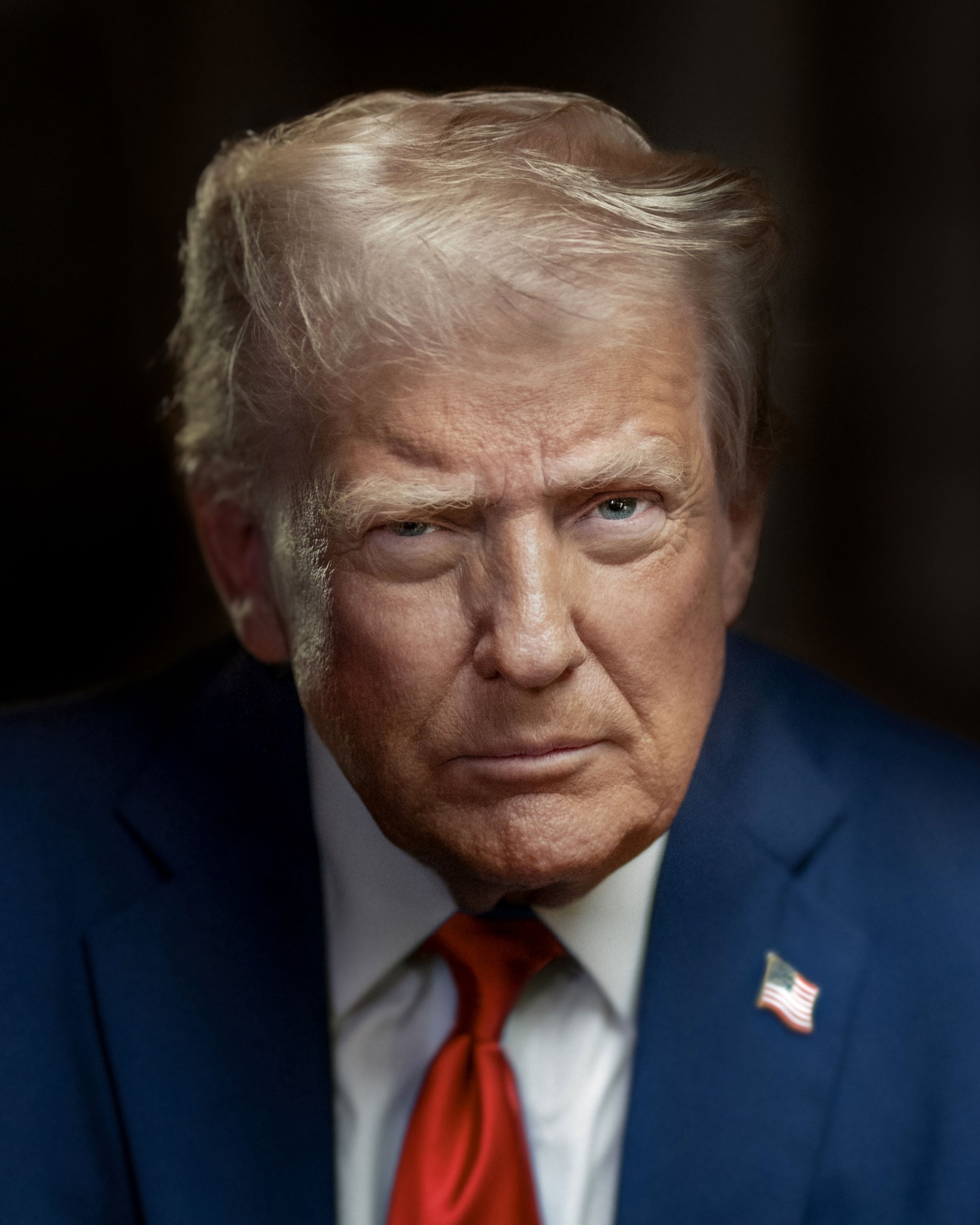
Donald Trump

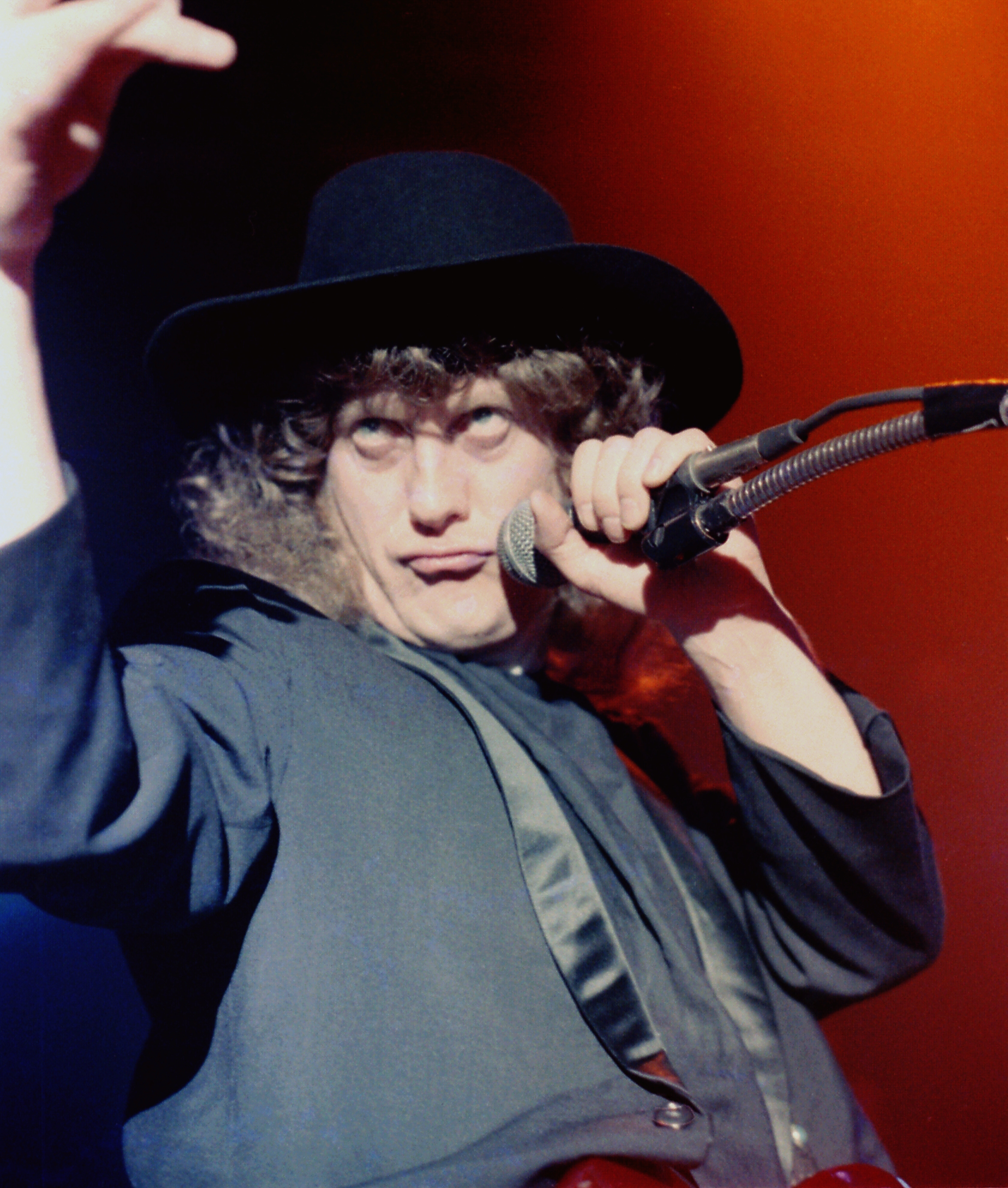
Noddy Holder

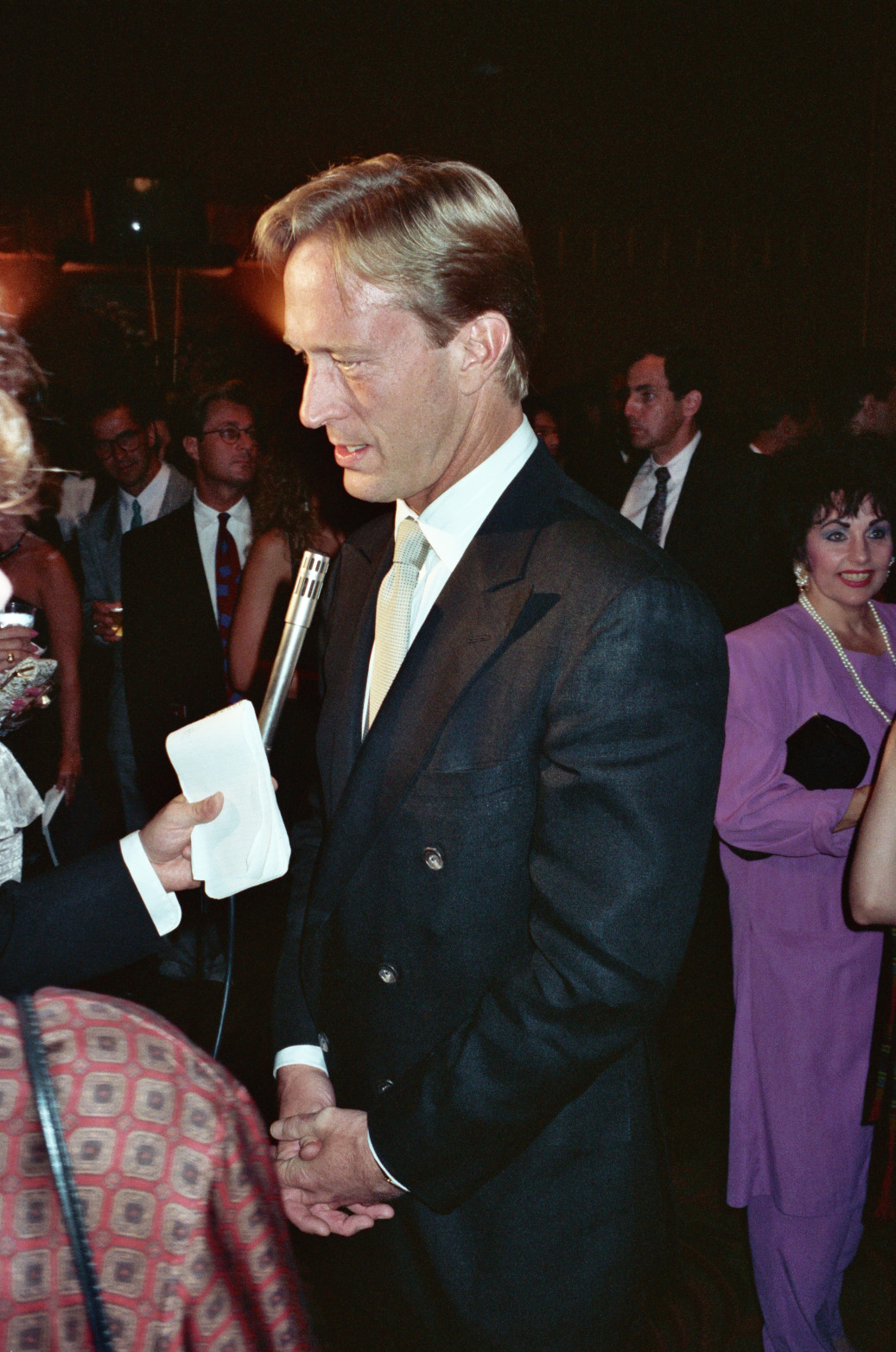
Ted Shackelford

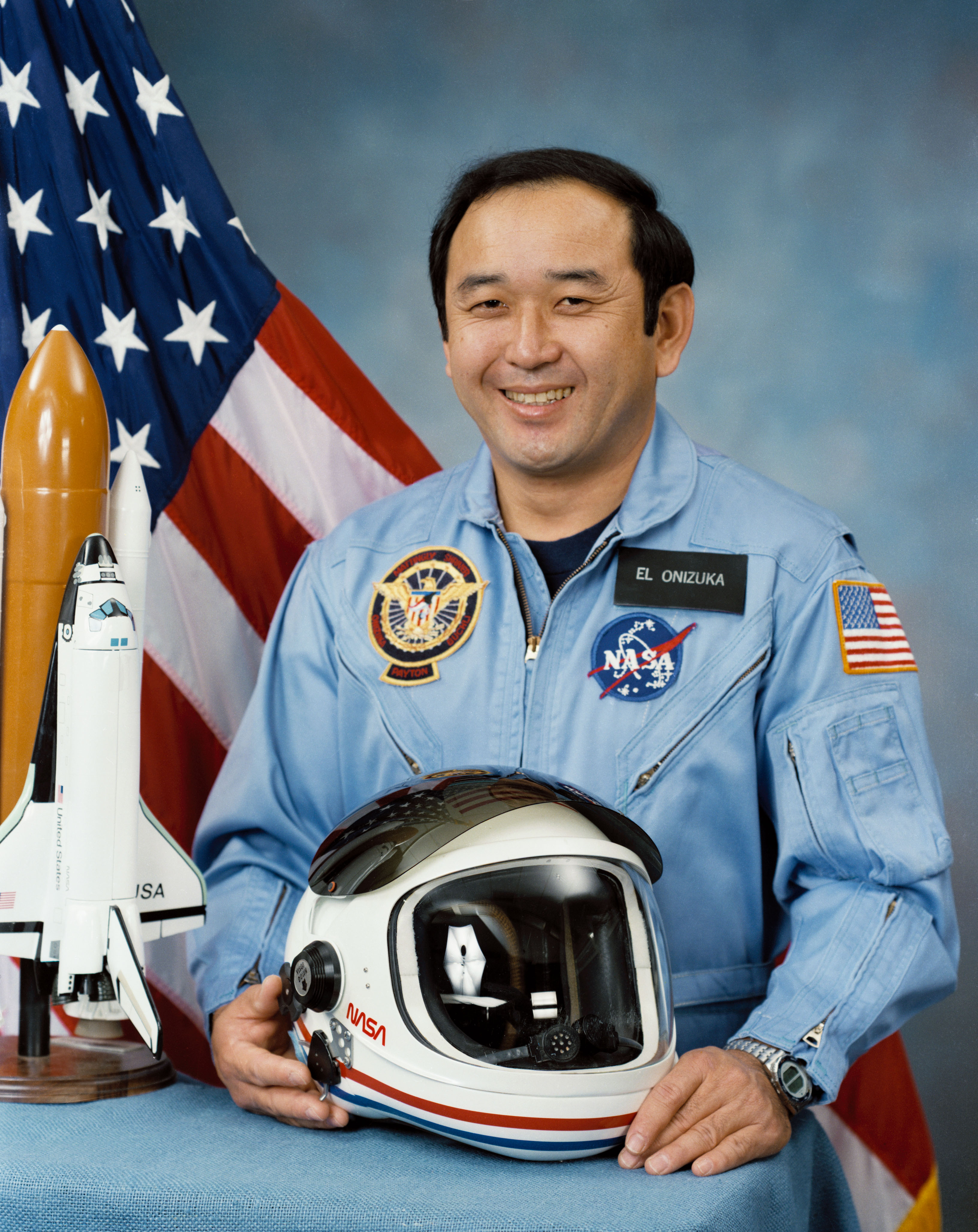
Ellison Onizuka

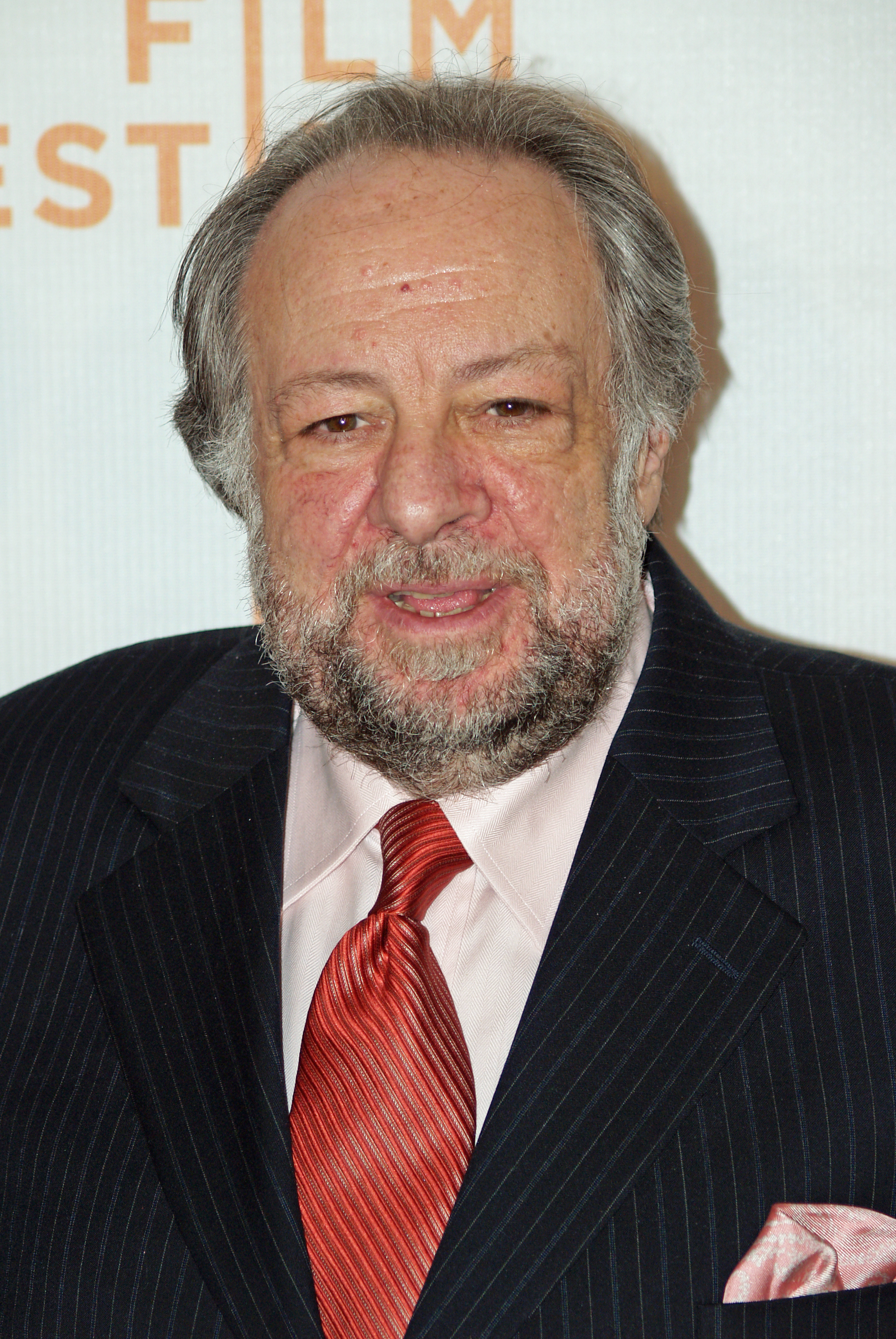
Ricky Jay

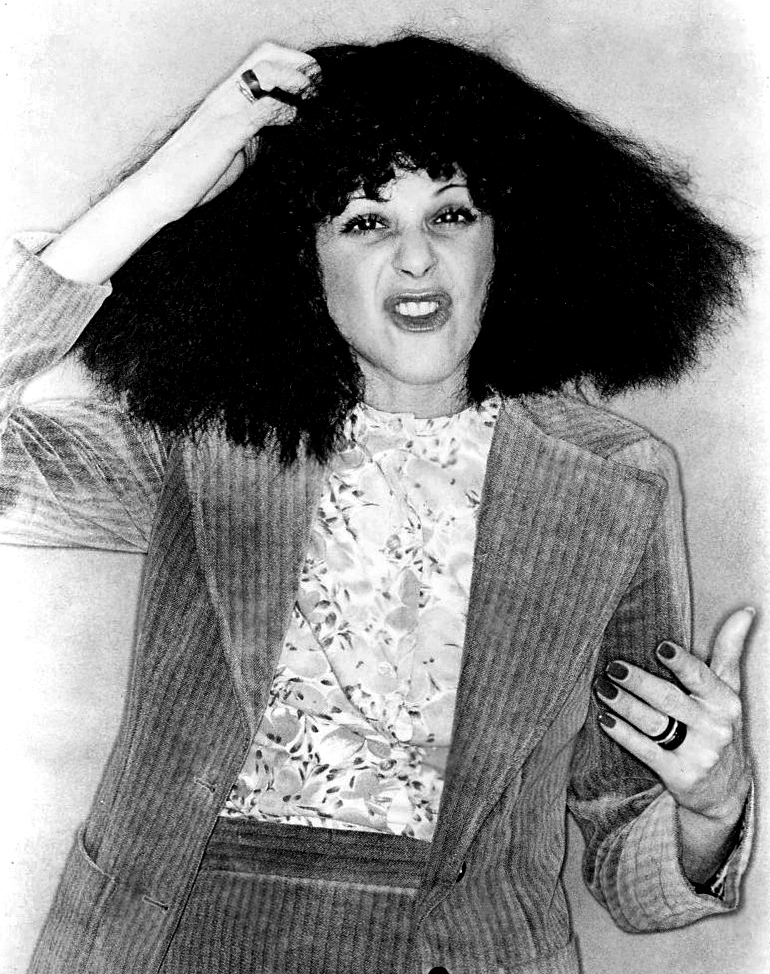
Gilda Radner

- June 1 – Brian Cox, Scottish actor
- June 2
  - Peter Sutcliffe, English serial killer (d. 2020)
  - Tomomichi Nishimura, Japanese voice actor
- June 3 – Michael Clarke, American musician (d. 1993)
- June 4
  - Mahmoud Abdel Aziz, Egyptian actor (d. 2016)
  - S. P. Balasubrahmanyam, Indian playback singer, television presenter, actor, music composer, dubbing artist and film producer (d. 2020)
- June 5 – Stefania Sandrelli, Italian actress
- June 7
  - Jenny Jones, Polish-Canadian comedian, talk show hostess
  - Zbigniew Seifert, Polish musician (d. 1979)
  - Robert Tilton, American televangelist, author
- June 8 – Pearlette Louisy, Governor-General of St. Lucia
- June 9 – Kenneth Adelman, American diplomat, political writer, policy analyst and Shakespeare scholar
- June 10 – Fernando Balzaretti, Mexican actor (d. 1998)
- June 11 – Biancamaria Frabotta, Italian writer (d. 2022)
- June 13
  - Paul L. Modrich, American biochemist, recipient of the Nobel Prize in Chemistry
  - Paul Buckmaster, (d. 2017) British cellist, arranger, conductor and composer
- June 14 – Donald Trump, 45th & 47th President of the United States
- June 15
  - Noddy Holder, English rock singer (Slade)
  - Janet Lennon, American singer (The Lennon Sisters)
  - Demis Roussos, Greek singer (d. 2015)
- June 16
  - Rick Adelman, American professional basketball player and coach (d. 2026)
  - John Astor, 3rd Baron Astor of Hever, English businessman and politician
- June 17 – Marcy Kaptur, U.S. Representative for the Ninth Congressional District of Ohio
- June 18
  - Bruiser Brody, American professional wrestler (d. 1988)
  - Russell Ash, British author (d. 2010)
  - Fabio Capello, Italian football player, manager
  - Maria Bethânia, Brazilian singer and songwriter
- June 21
  - Vincenzo Camporini, Italian Chief of the Defence General Staff
  - Kiril Ivkov, Bulgarian football defender
- June 22
  - Kay Redfield Jamison, American psychiatrist
  - Fabio Enzo, Italian football player (d. 2021)
  - Józef Oleksy, 7th Prime Minister of Poland (d. 2015)
- June 23 – Ted Shackelford, American actor
- June 24
  - Nguyễn Đức Soát, Vietnamese general
  - Ellison Onizuka, American astronaut (d. 1986)
  - Robert Reich, 22nd United States Secretary of Labor
- June 25
  - Stan Bunn, American politician and lawyer
  - Henk van Kessel, Dutch road racer
- June 26
  - Maria von Welser, German TV journalist, President of UNICEF Germany
  - Anthony John Valentine Obinna, Nigerian priest
  - Leo Rossi, American actor
  - Ricky Jay, American actor, author and magician (d. 2018)
- June 27 – Russ Critchfield, American basketball player
- June 28
  - David Duckham, English rugby union player
  - Gilda Radner, American comedian, actress (Saturday Night Live) (d. 1989)
  - Jaime Guzmán, Chilean lawyer and senator, founder of the Independent Democratic Union (d. 1991)
  - Robert Asprin, American science fiction and fantasy author and active fan (d. 2008)
- June 29
  - Egon von Fürstenberg, Swiss fashion designer (d. 2004)
  - Gitte Hænning, Danish singer
  - Ram Gopal Yadav, Indian politician
  - Ernesto Pérez Balladares, President of Panama
- June 30
  - Allan Hunter, Irish footballer, manager
  - William J. Boarman, American printer and civil servant (d. 2021)

=== July ===
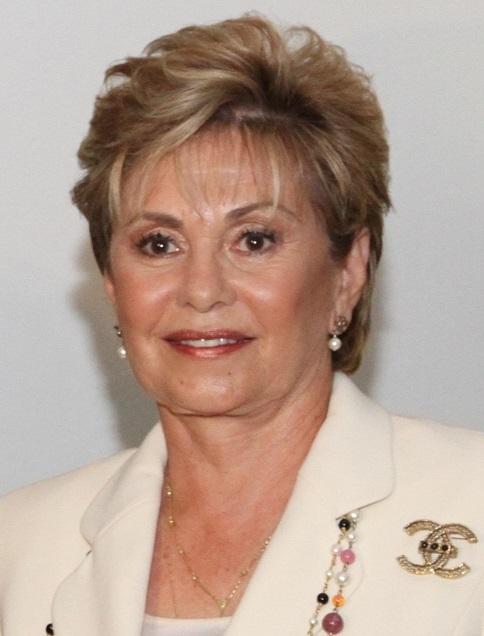
Mireya Moscoso

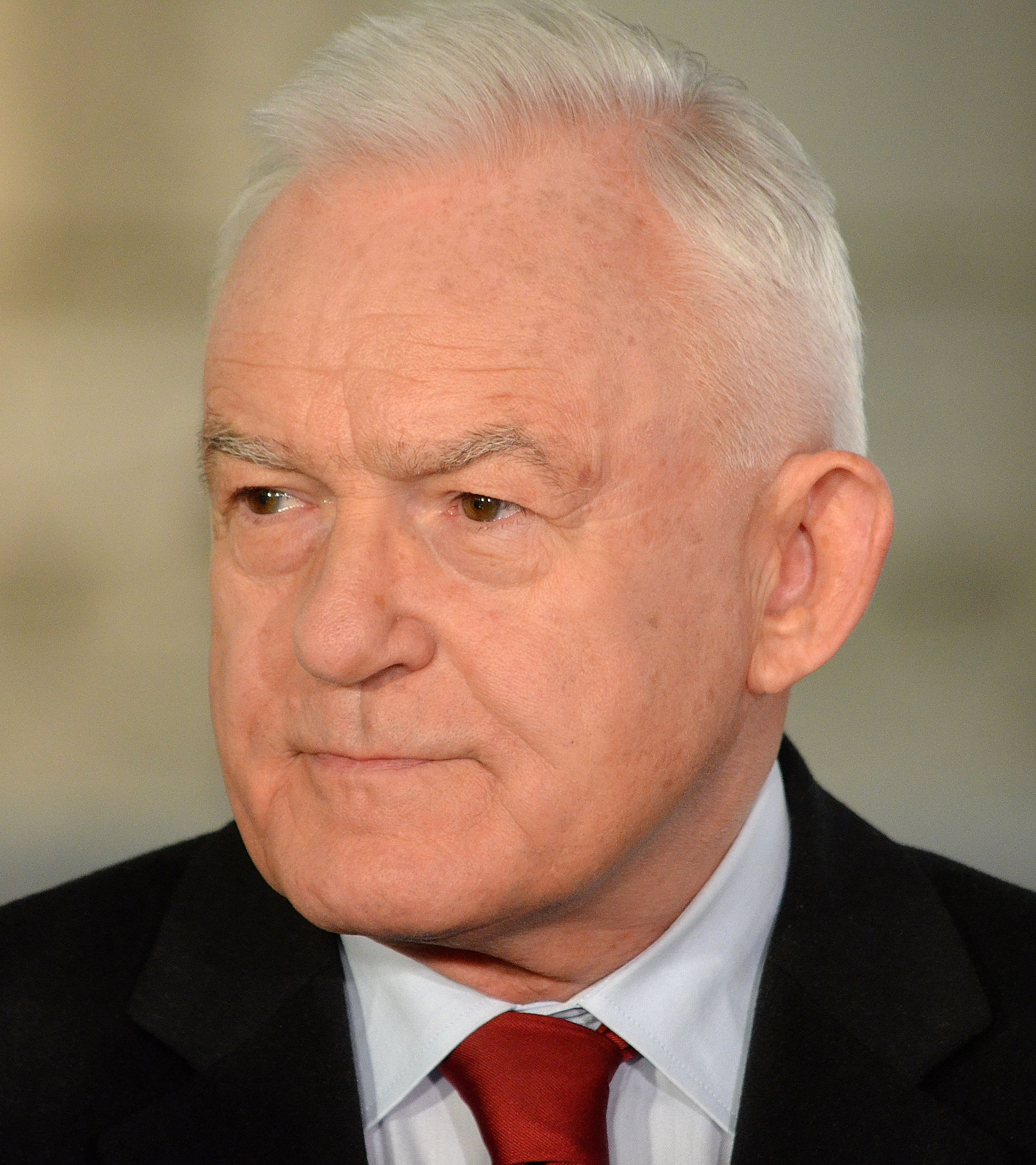
Leszek Miller

George W. Bush

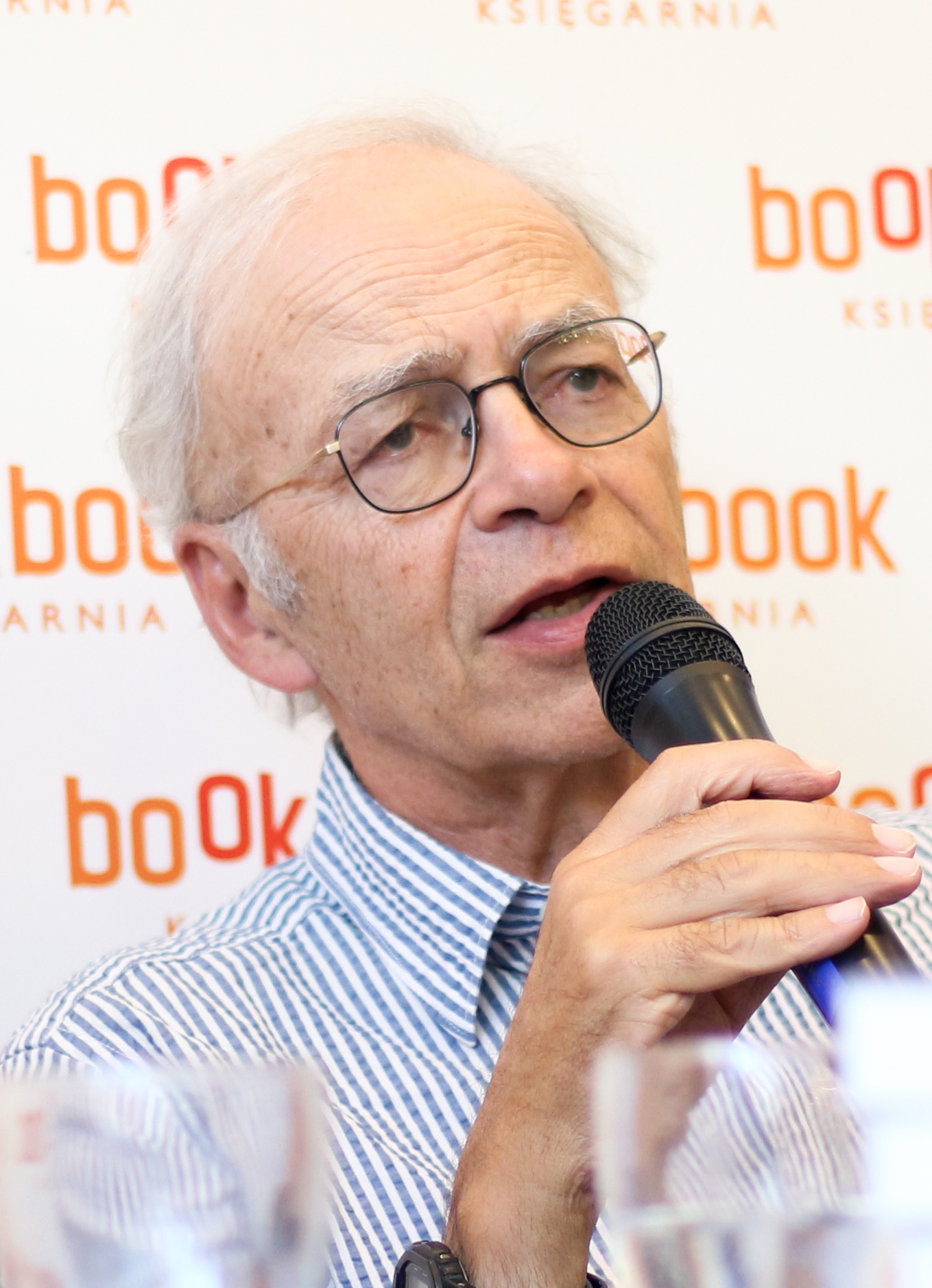
Peter Singer

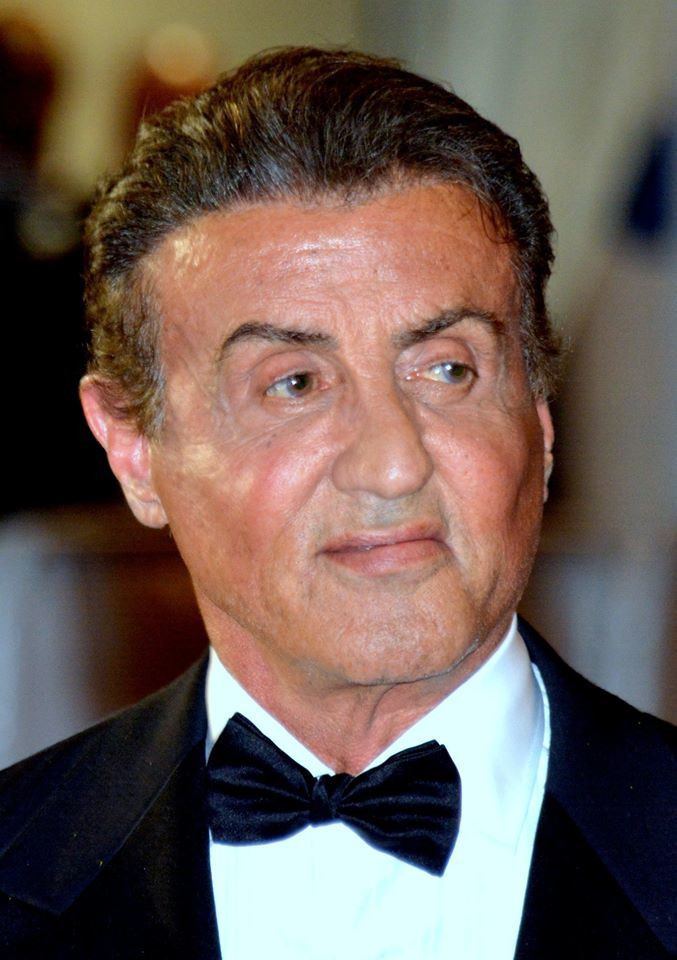
Sylvester Stallone

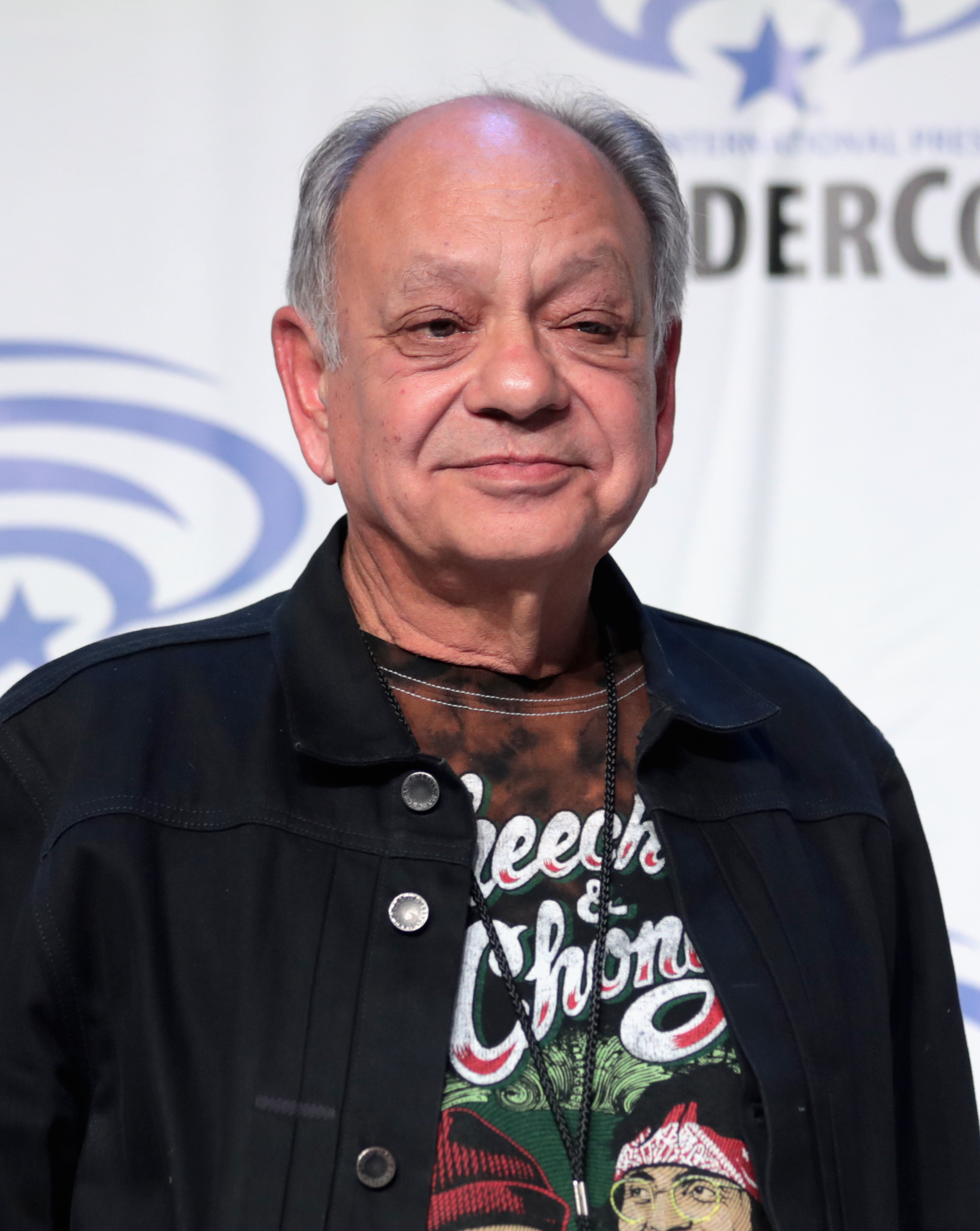
Cheech Marin

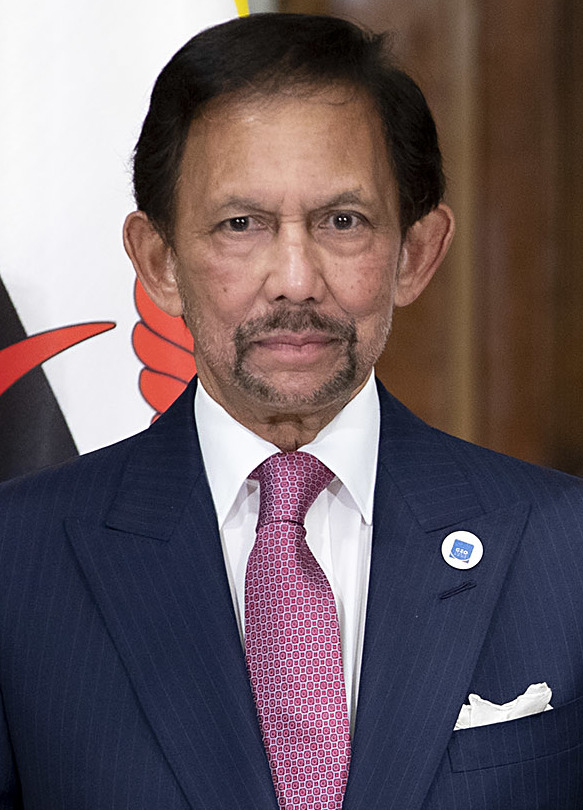
Hassanal Bolkiah

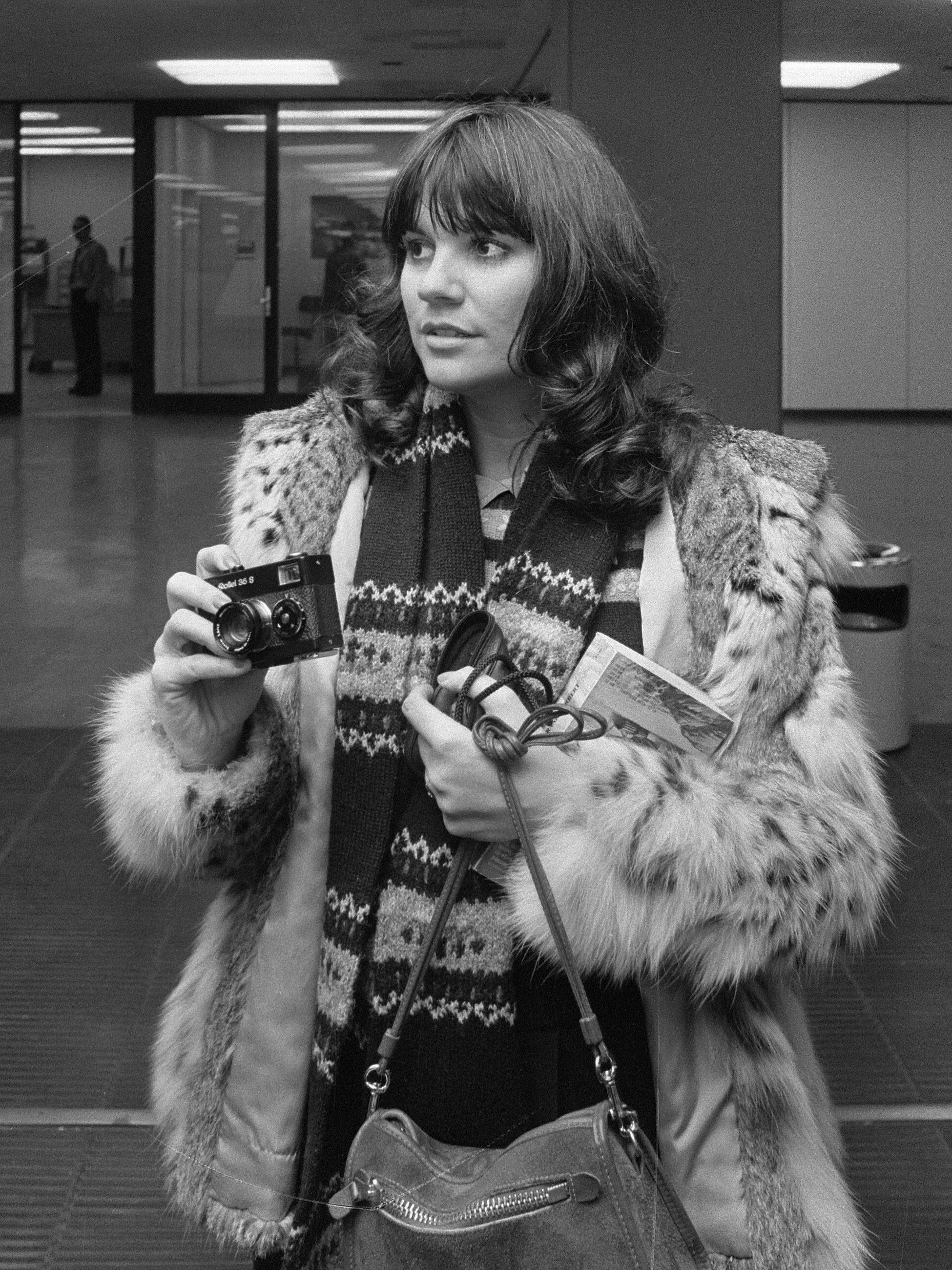
Linda Ronstadt

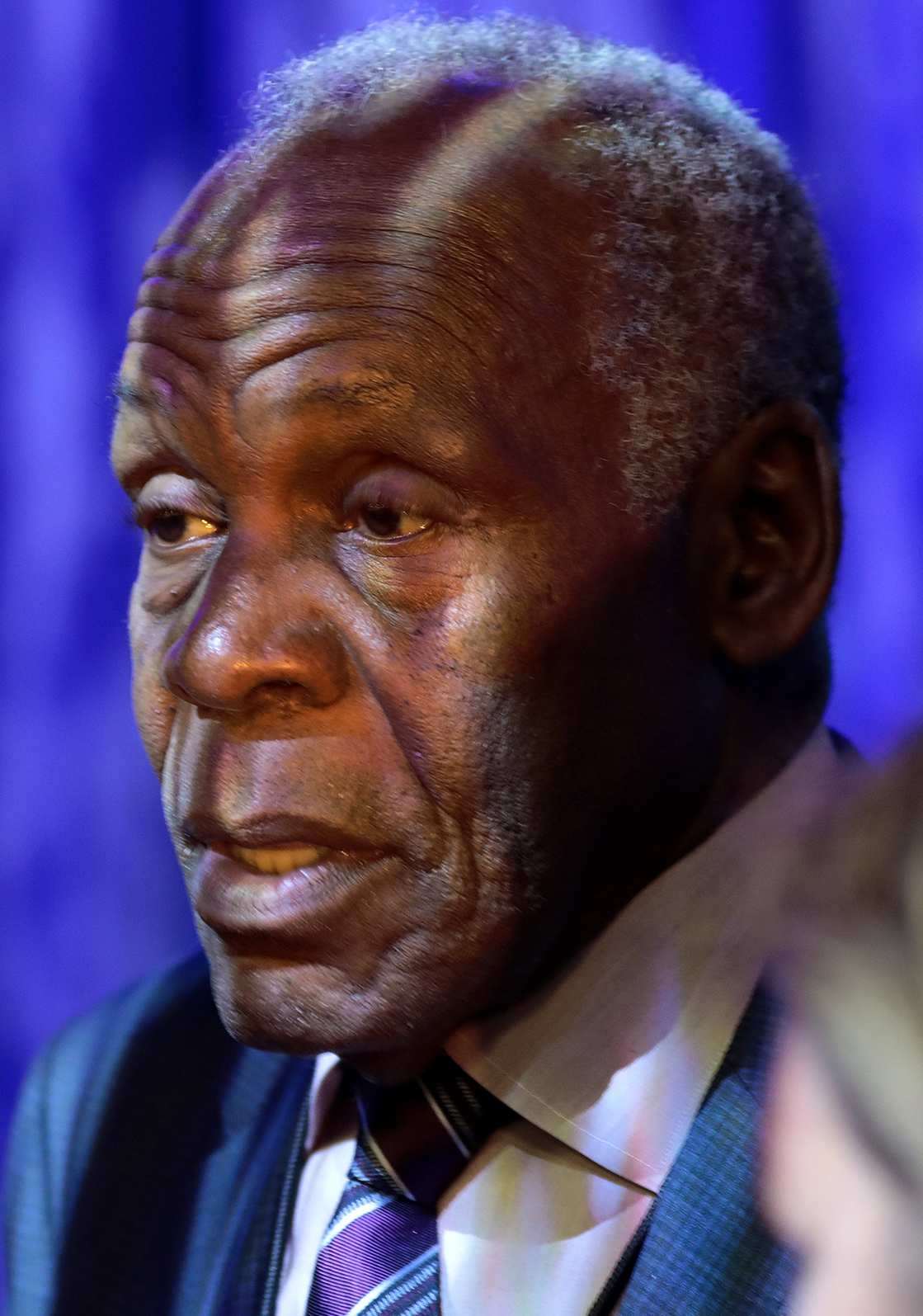
Danny Glover

- July 1
  - Alceu Valença, Brazilian composer, writer, performer, actor and poet
  - Mireya Moscoso, President of Panama
  - Mick Aston, English archaeologist (d. 2013)
- July 2
  - Richard Axel, American scientist, recipient of the Nobel Prize in Physiology or Medicine
  - Bahrin Abbas, lawyer and politician in the Government of Brunei
- July 3
  - Leszek Miller, Prime Minister of Poland
  - Ted Bell, American author (d. 2023)
- July 4
  - Sam Hunt, New Zealand poet
  - Michael Milken, American financier
  - Ed O'Ross, American actor
  - Roy Cimatu, Filipino general
- July 5
  - Gerard 't Hooft, Dutch physicist and academic, Nobel Prize laureate
  - Ram Vilas Paswan, Indian politician
  - Balakumaran, Indian Tamil writer and author (d. 2018)
- July 6
  - George W. Bush, 43rd President of the United States
  - Fred Dryer, American football defensive end, actor (Hunter)
  - Tiemen Groen, Dutch cyclist
  - Freddie Mwila, Zambian footballer (d. 2026)
  - Peter Singer, Australian philosopher
  - Sylvester Stallone, American actor, screenwriter and film director (Rocky)
- July 7
  - Tadeusz Nowicki, Polish tennis player
  - Syd Barrett, English singer, guitarist and songwriter and co-founder of Pink Floyd (d. 2006)
  - Claudio Merlo, Italian footballer and coach
- July 8
  - Massimo Vanni, Italian actor
  - Daniela Beneck, Italian freestyle swimmer
- July 9
  - Mitch Mitchell, English drummer (The Jimi Hendrix Experience) (d. 2008)
  - Bon Scott, Australian rock singer (AC/DC) (d. 1980)
- July 10
  - Oliver Martin, American cyclist
  - Sue Lyon, American actress (d. 2019)
- July 11
  - Jean-Pierre Coopman, Belgian boxer
  - Jack Wrangler, American porn star (d. 2009)
  - Ed Markey, US Senator
- July 12
  - Ernesto Mahieux, Italian actor
  - Sian Barbara Allen, American actress (d. 2025)
- July 13
  - João Bosco, Brazilian singer, songwriter
  - Cheech Marin, Mexican-American actor, comedian (Cheech and Chong)
- July 14
  - Vincent Pastore, American actor (d. 2026)
  - John Wood, Australian actor
- July 15
  - Hassanal Bolkiah, Sultan of Brunei
  - Linda Ronstadt, American singer, songwriter ("You're No Good")
- July 16
  - Toshio Furukawa, Japanese voice actor
  - Dave Goelz, American puppeteer
  - Monica Aspelund, Finnish singer
  - Ron Yary, American football player
  - Ahmad Albar, Indonesian rock musician and vocalist
  - Barbara Lee, Former US Rep.
- July 17
  - Claudia Islas, Mexican actress
  - Alun Armstrong, English actor
- July 18 – Kanat Saudabayev, Kazakhstani politician
- July 19 – Ilie Năstase, Romanian tennis player
- July 20 – Htin Kyaw, 9th President of Myanmar
- July 21 – Domingo Cavallo, Argentine economist, politician
- July 22
  - Danny Glover, African-American actor, film director and political activist
  - Mireille Mathieu, French singer
  - Petre Roman, 53rd Prime Minister of Romania
  - Johnson Toribiong, 8th President of Palau
- July 23
  - Sally Flynn, American singer
  - Edoardo Bennato, Italian singer-songwriter
- July 24 – Farouk Abdul-Aziz, Egyptian TV presenter, interviewer, writer, producer and director
- July 25 – Rita Marley, Cuban-Jamaican singer
- July 27
  - Gwynne Gilford, American actress
  - Jacques Sylla, 12th Prime Minister of Madagascar (d. 2009)
- July 28 – Jonathan Edwards, American singer-songwriter and guitarist
- July 29
  - Ximena Armas, Chilean painter
  - Stig Blomqvist, Swedish rally driver
- July 30
  - Neil Bonnett, American race car driver (d. 1994)
  - A. Rahman Hassan, Malaysian singer (d. 2019)

=== August ===
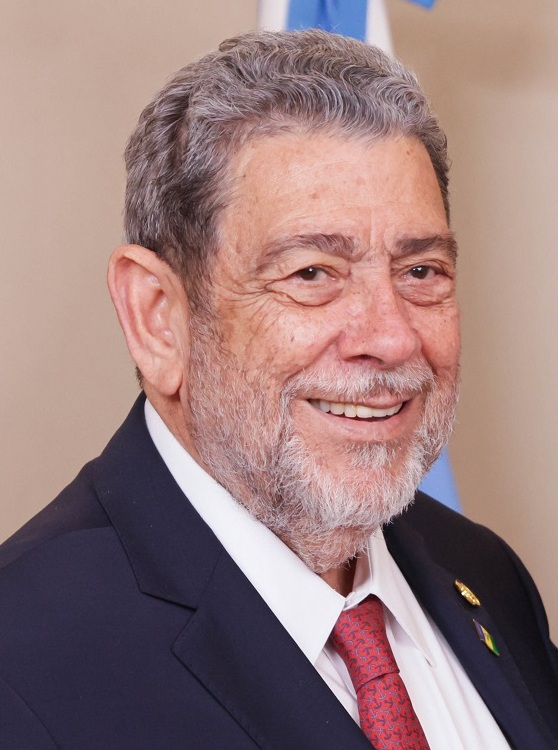
Ralph Gonsalves

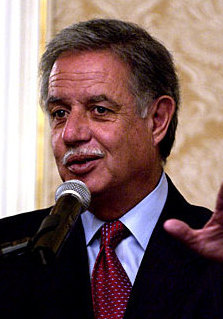
Óscar Berger

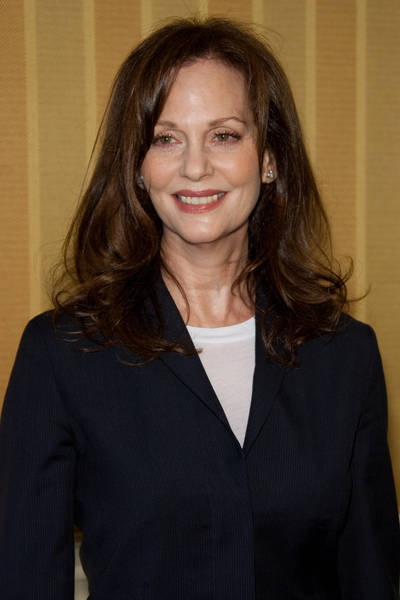
Lesley Ann Warren

Bill Clinton

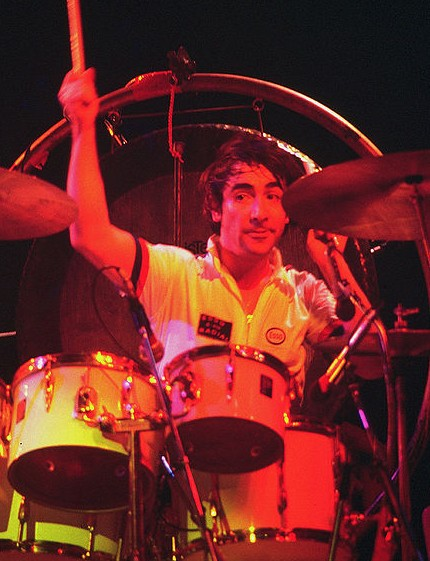
Keith Moon

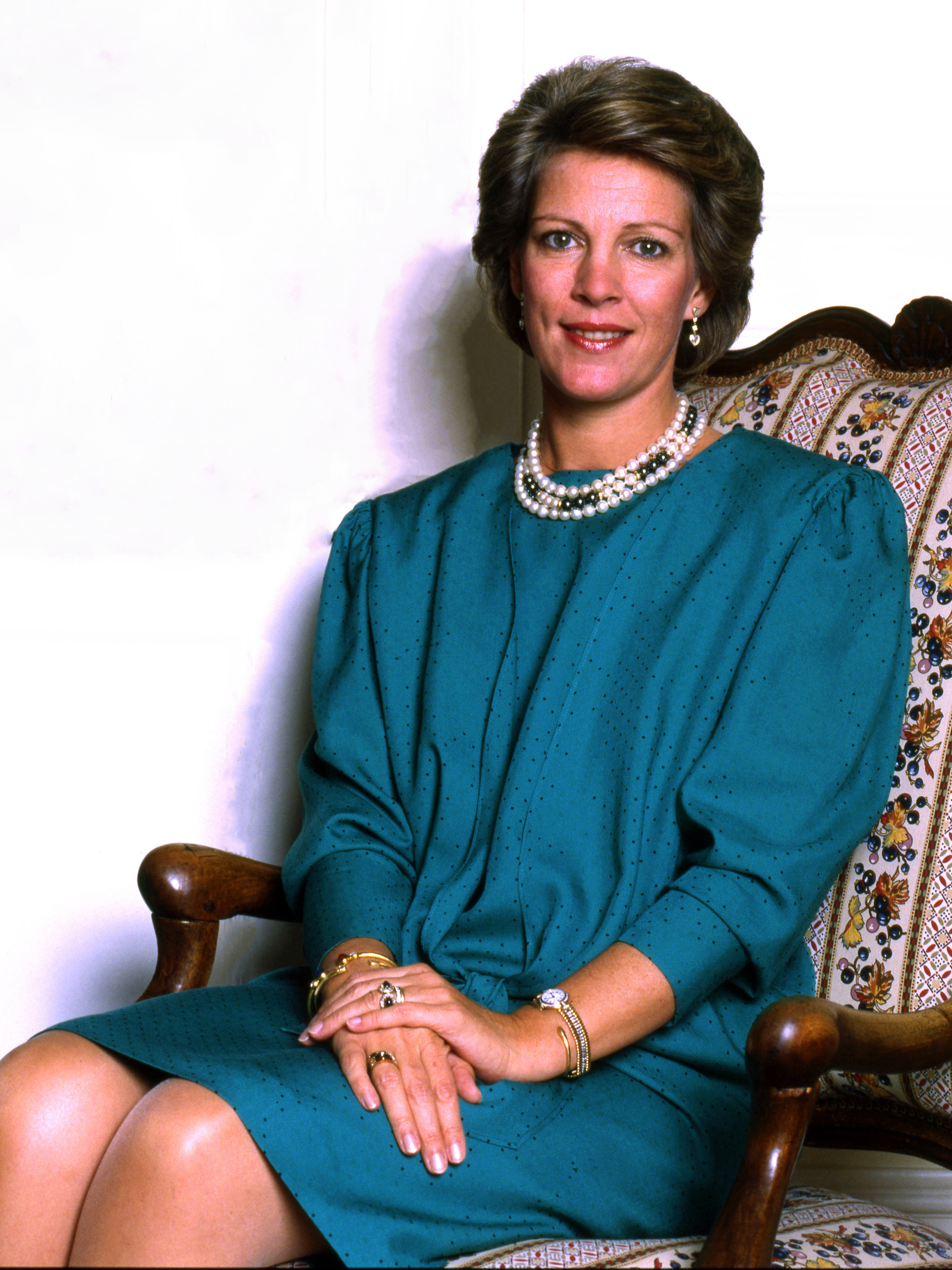
Queen Anne-Marie of Greece

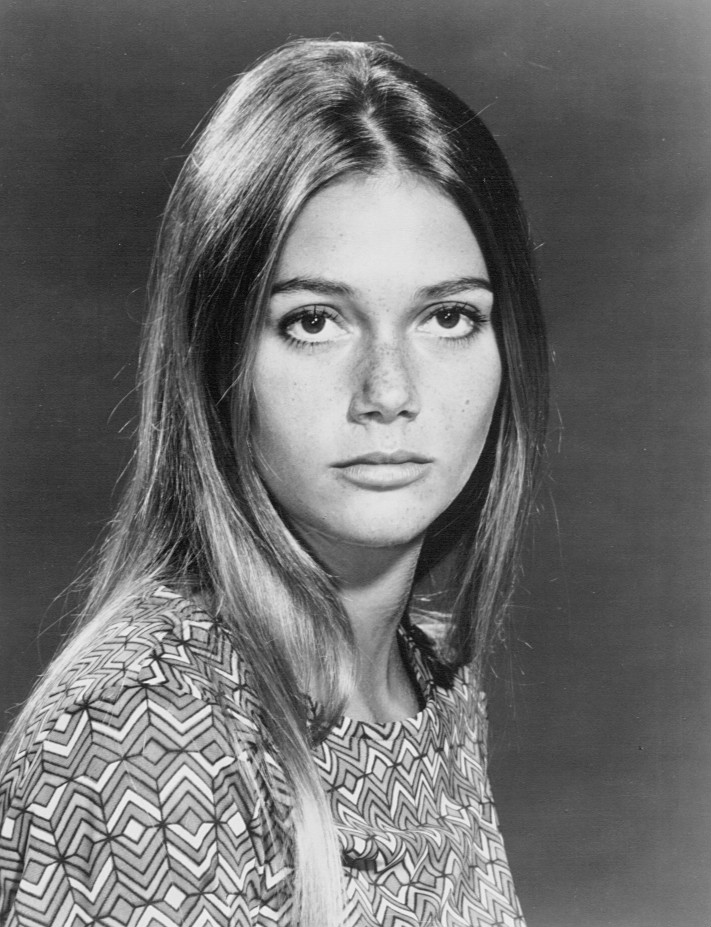
Peggy Lipton

- August 1
  - Mike Emrick, American sportscaster
  - Sandi Griffiths, American singer
  - Rick Boucher, American politician
  - Boz Burrell, English musician (d. 2006)
- August 3
  - Jack Straw, English politician
  - Nikolai Burlyayev, Soviet and Russian actor and film director
- August 4 – Ramazan Abdulatipov, Russian politician and professor
- August 5
  - Reinhard Tritscher, Austrian alpine skier (d. 2018)
  - Ron Silliman, American poet
  - Shirley Ann Jackson, African-American President of Rensselaer Polytechnic Institute, Chair of the President's Intelligence Advisory Board
  - Jean-Charles Ablitzer, French organist and pedagogue
- August 6 – Allan Holdsworth, British musician (d. 2017)
- August 8 – Ralph Gonsalves, 4th Prime Minister of Saint Vincent and the Grenadines
- August 9 – Jim Kiick, American football player
- August 11 – Óscar Berger, 34th President of Guatemala
- August 12 – Terry Nutkins, English naturalist (d. 2012)
- August 13
  - Janet Yellen, American Chair of the Federal Reserve
- August 14
  - Dennis Hof, American brothel owner (d. 2018)
  - Bjørn Kruse, Norwegian painter and composer
- August 16
  - Masoud Barzani, Iraqi-Kurdish politician, President of Iraqi Kurdistan
  - Lesley Ann Warren, American actress, singer
  - Louis-Pierre Bougie, Canadian painter and printmaker (d. 2021)
- August 17 – Drake Levin, American rock guitarist (Paul Revere & the Raiders) (d. 2009)
- August 18 – William Brisson, American politician
- August 19
  - Charles Bolden, African-American astronaut
  - Bill Clinton, 42nd President of the United States
  - Beat Raaflaub, Swiss conductor
- August 20
  - Connie Chung, Asian-American reporter
  - Ralf Hütter, German techno musician (Kraftwerk)
  - N. R. Narayana Murthy, Indian businessman
- August 22 – Wayne Brown, New Zealand politician and the mayor of Auckland
- August 23
  - Keith Moon, English rock drummer (The Who) (d. 1978)
  - Raza Murad, Indian actor
  - Bob Boetticher, American funeral director
- August 24 – BP Fallon, Irish musician and broadcaster
- August 25
  - Rollie Fingers, American baseball player
  - Charles Ghigna, American poet, children's author
- August 26
  - Valerie Simpson, African-American singer
  - Mark Snow, American composer (d. 2025)
  - Zhou Ji, education minister of the People's Republic of China
  - Swede Savage, American race car driver (d. 1973)
- August 29
  - Jean-Baptiste Bagaza, 2nd President of Burundi (d. 2016)
  - Bob Beamon, American athlete
  - Demetris Christofias, 6th President of Cyprus (d. 2019)
  - Leona Gom, Canadian novelist and poet
- August 30
  - Queen Anne-Marie of Greece
  - Peggy Lipton, American actress and model (d. 2019)
  - Gábor Bódy, Hungarian film director, screenwriter, theorist and actor (d. 1985)
- August 31
  - Ann Coffey, Scottish politician
  - Jerome Corsi, American political commentator and conspiracy theorist
  - Tom Coughlin, American football player, coach and executive

=== September ===
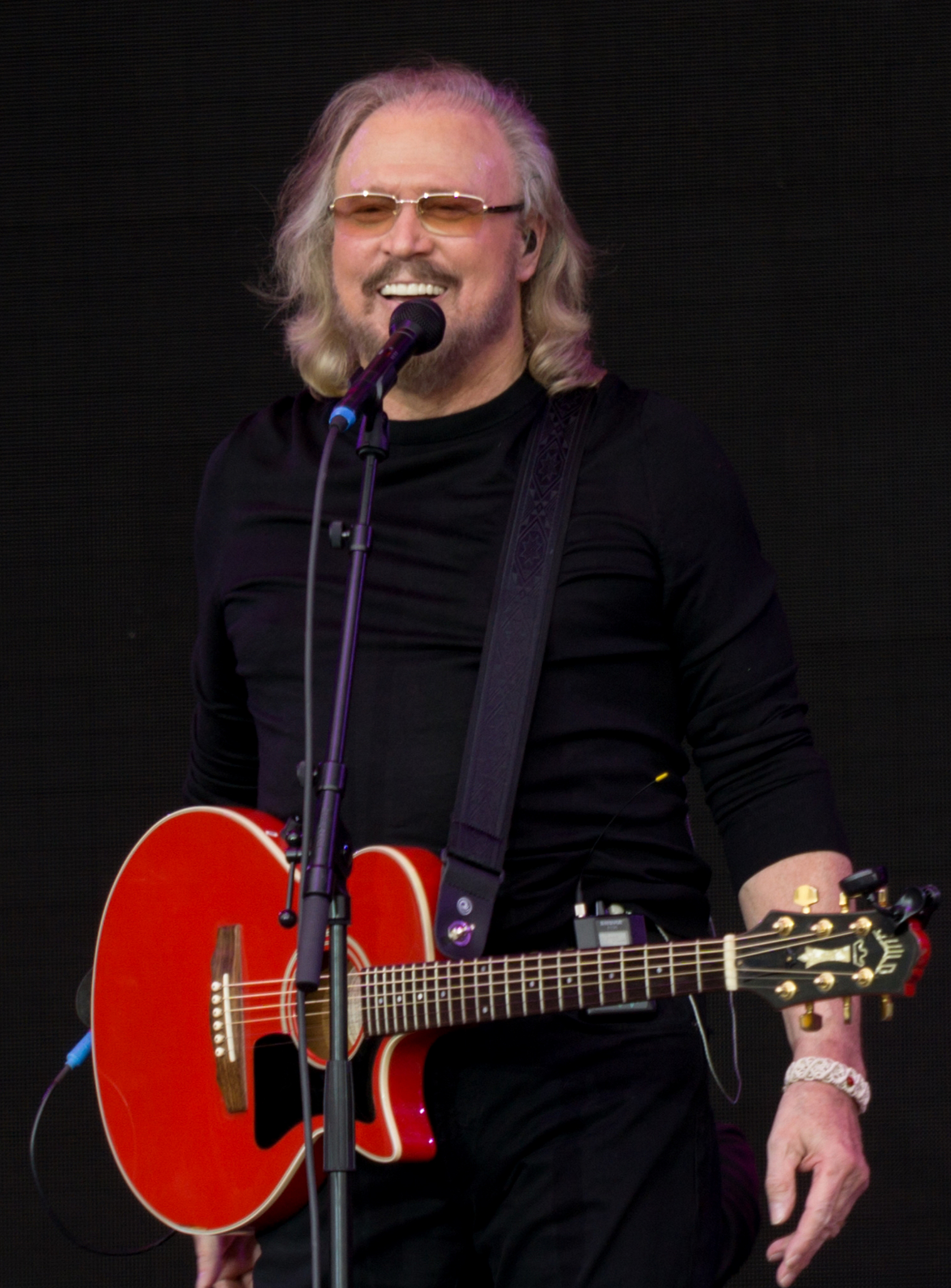
Sir Barry Gibb

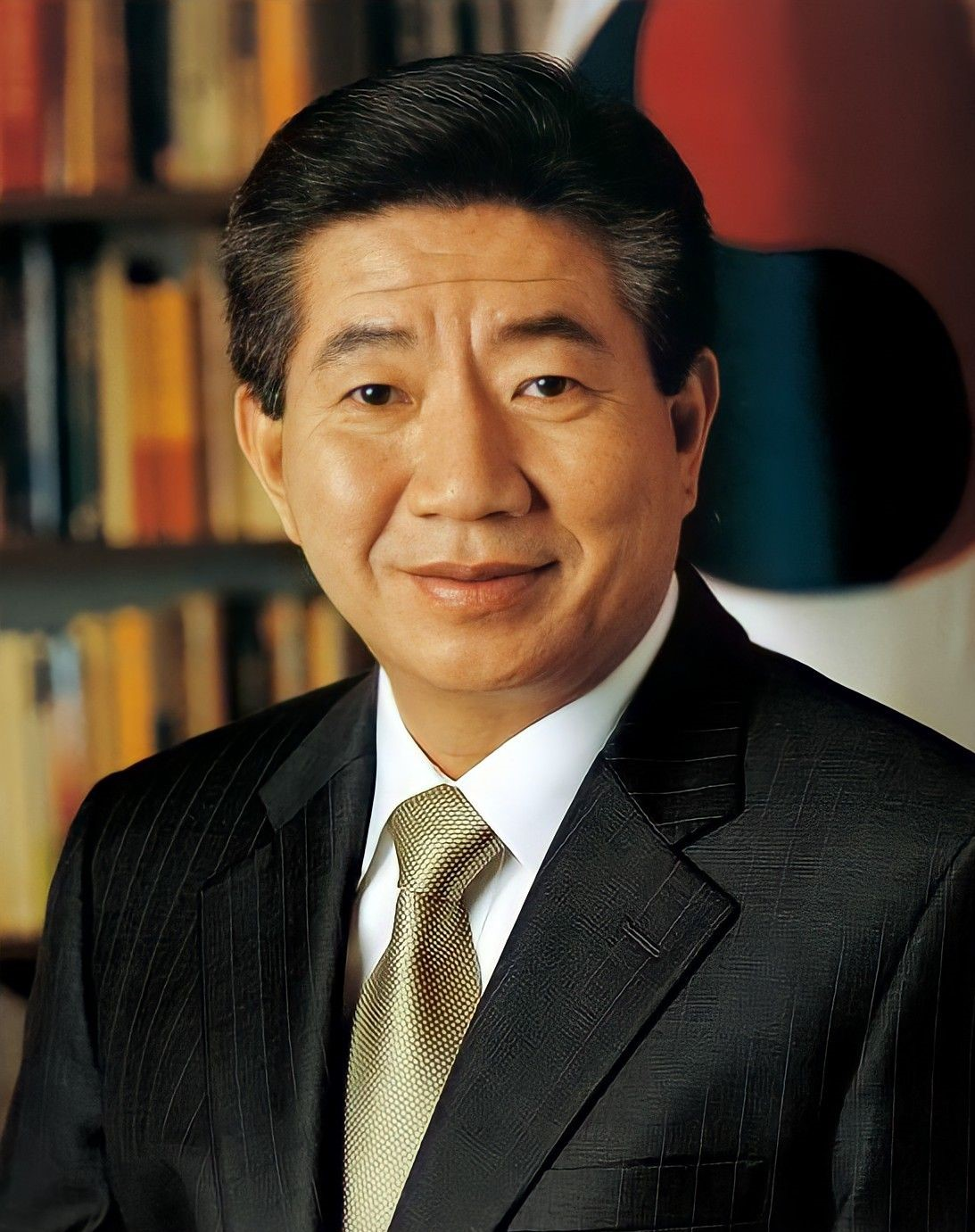
Roh Moo-hyun

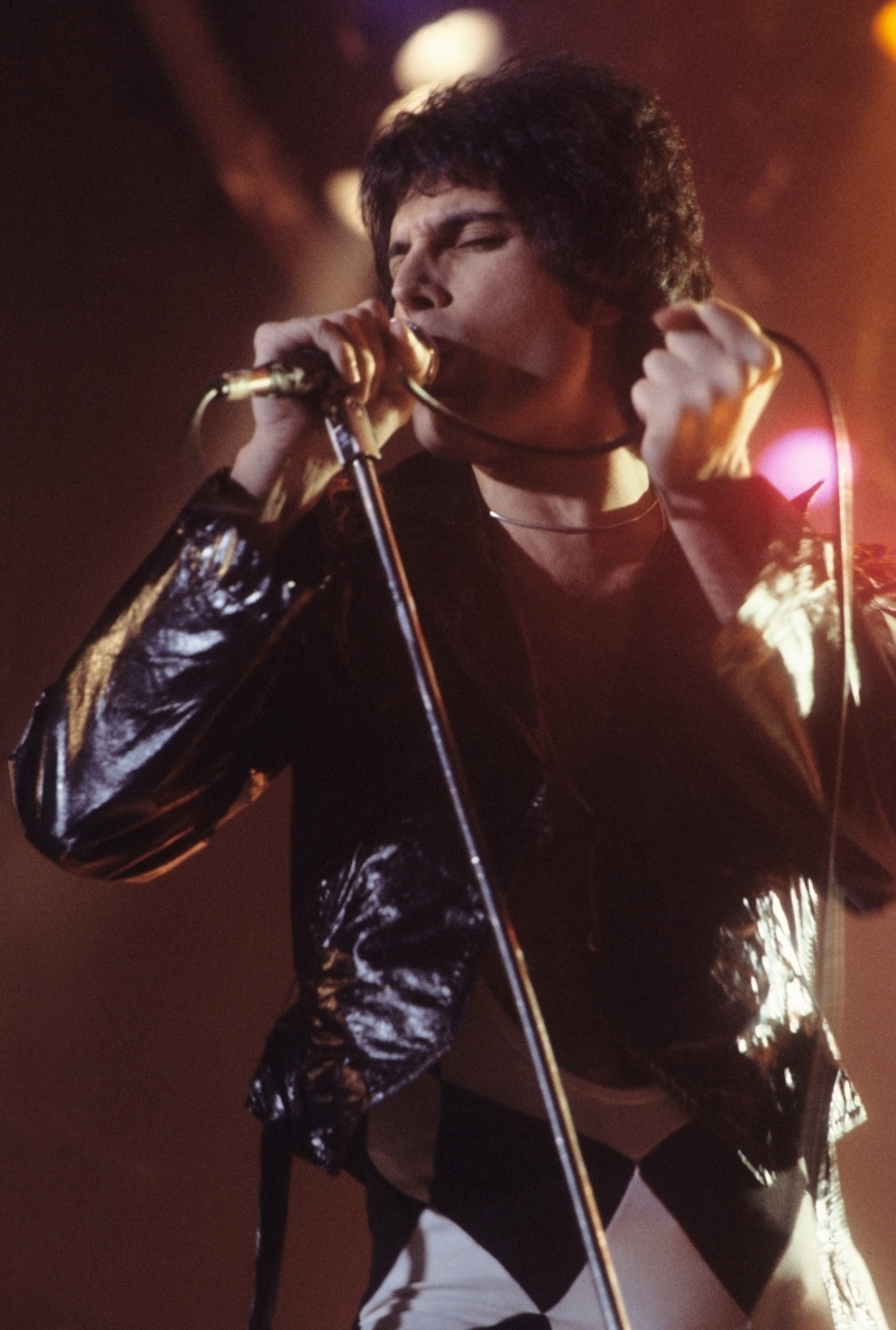
Freddie Mercury

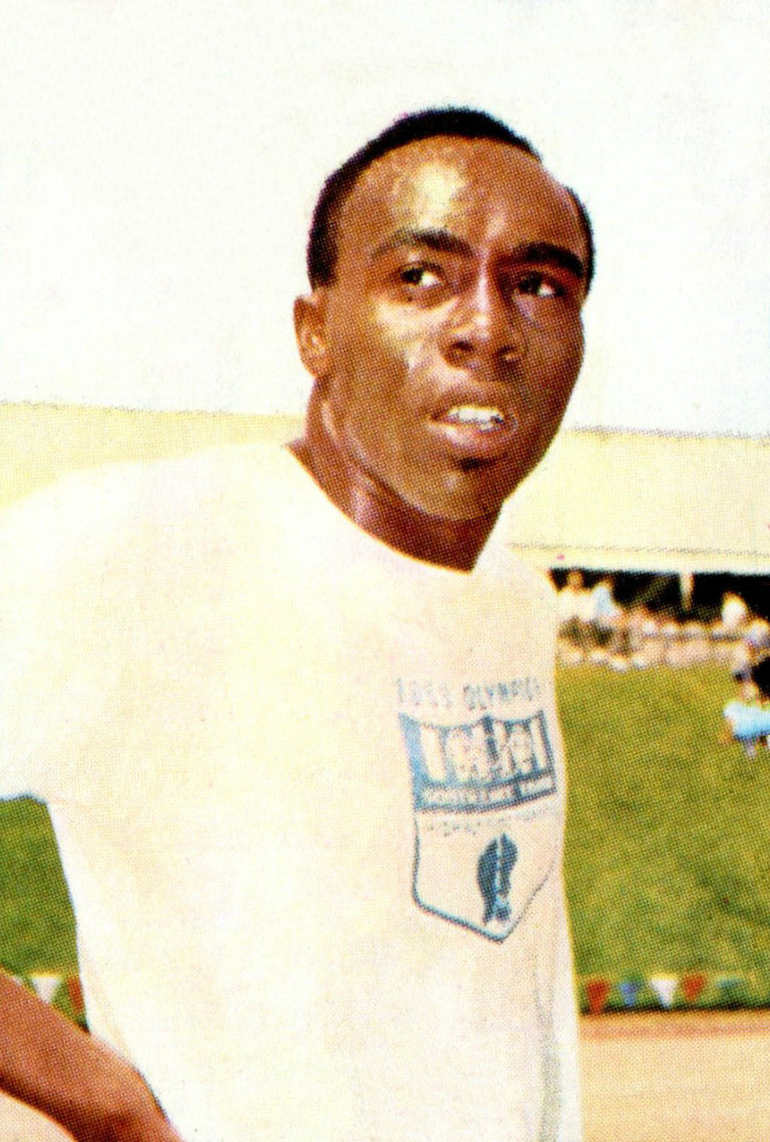
Jim Hines

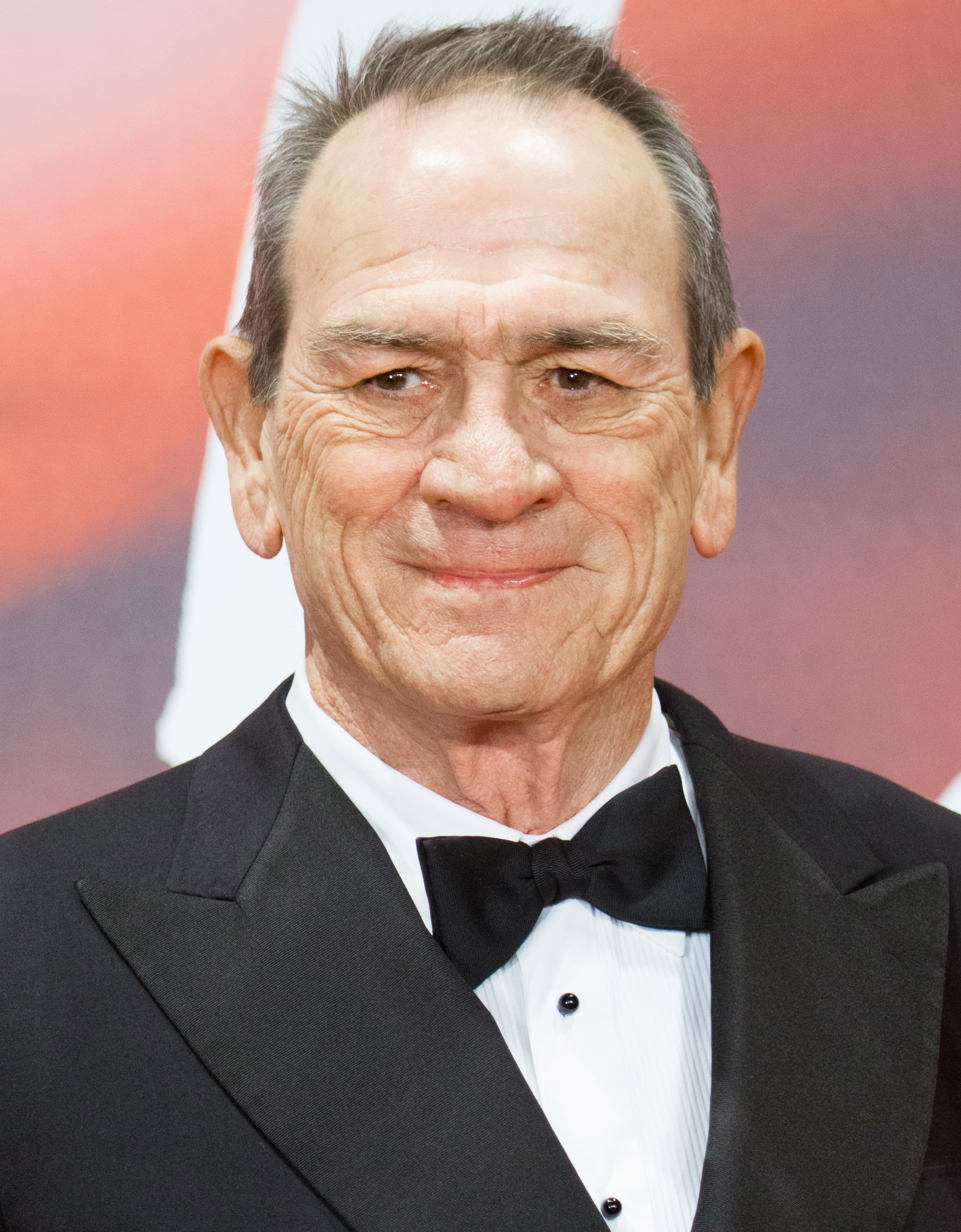
Tommy Lee Jones

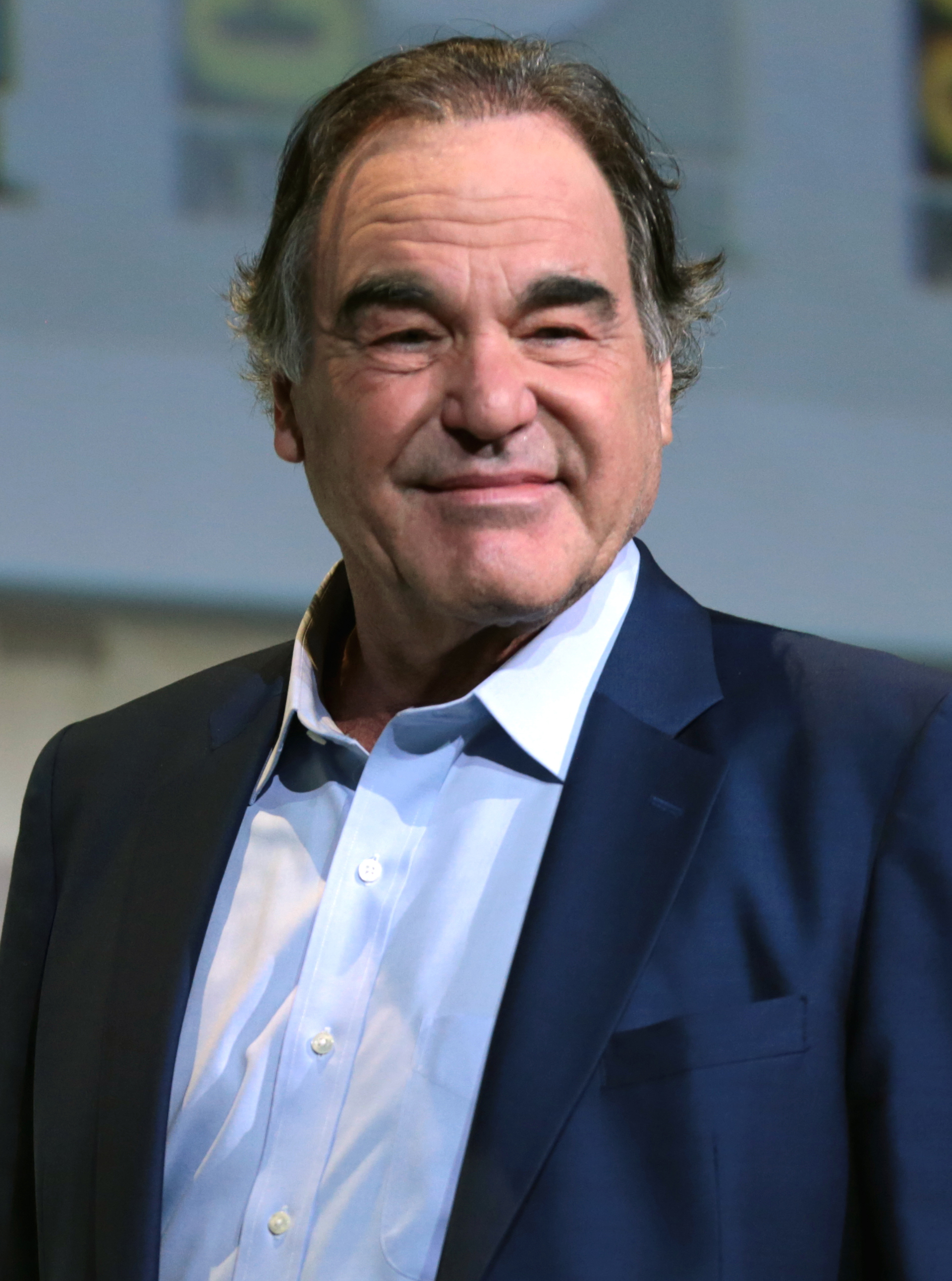
Oliver Stone

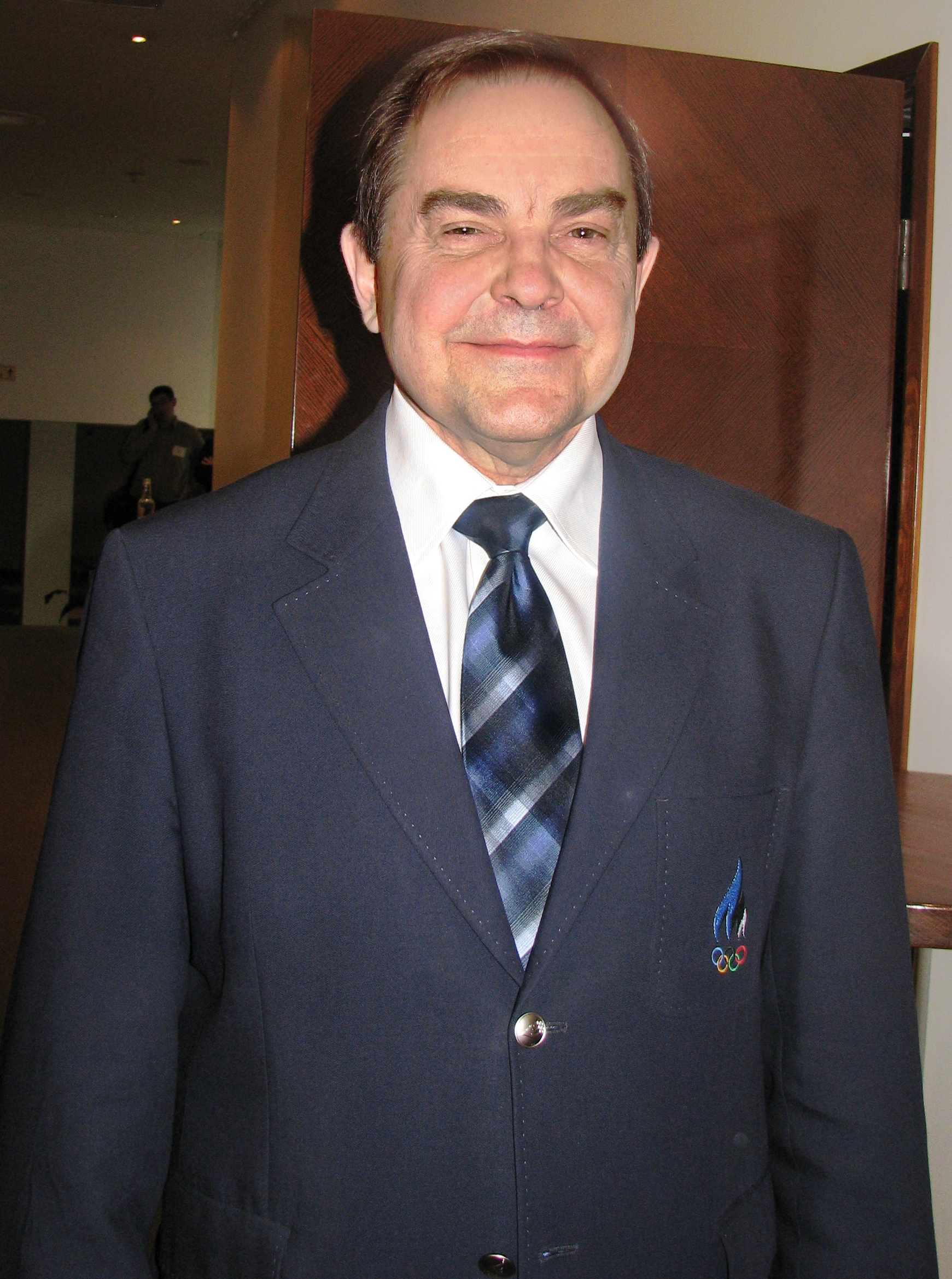
Mart Siimann

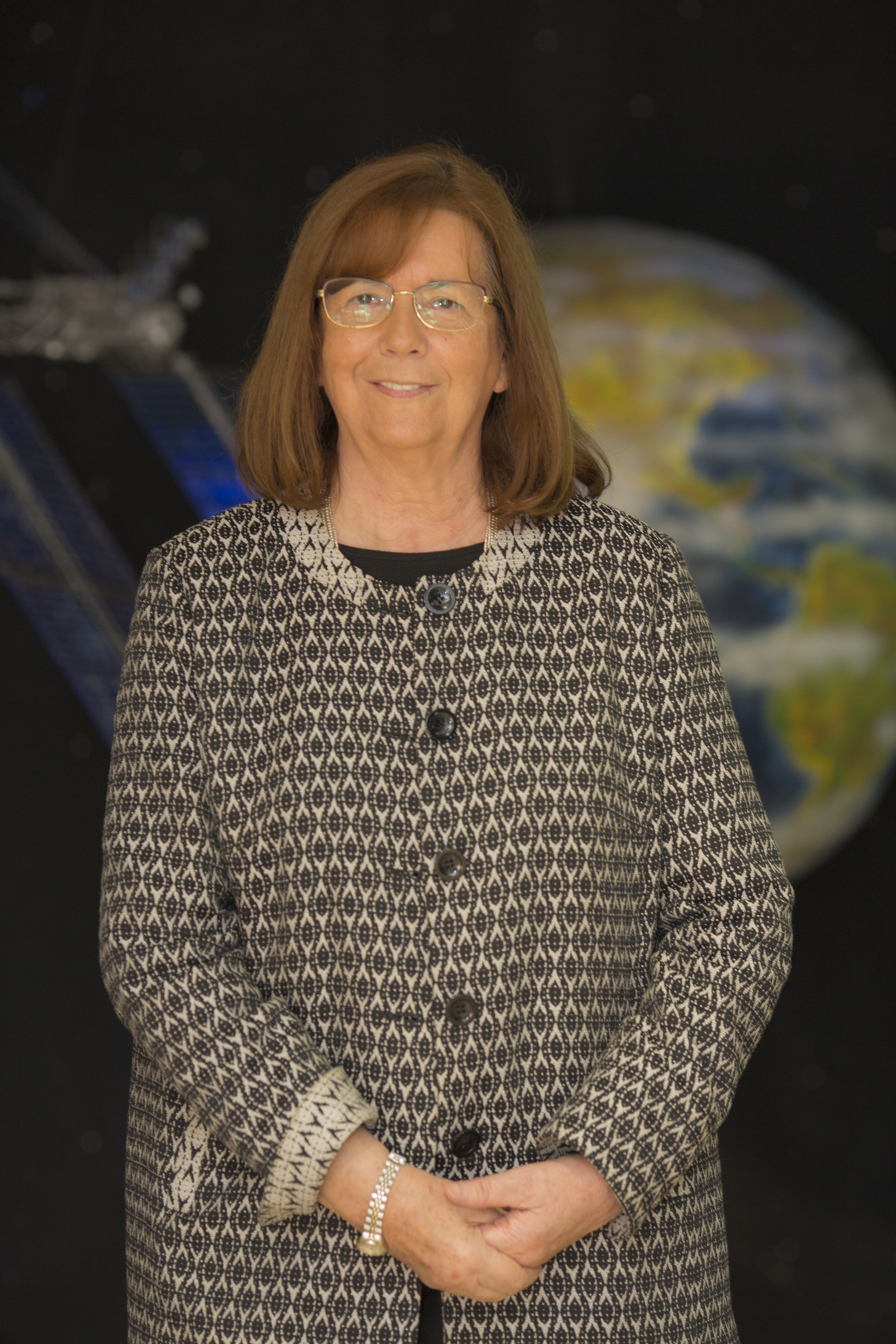
María Teresa Ruiz

- September 1
  - Barry Gibb, Manx-born Australian-British singer (Bee Gees)
  - Roh Moo-hyun, President of South Korea (d. 2009)
- September 2
  - Luis Ávalos, Cuban-born American character actor (d. 2014)
  - Billy Preston, African-American soul musician ("Nothing from Nothing") (d. 2006)
  - Dan White, American politician, murderer (d. 1985)
- September 3
  - John N. Abrams, American military officer (d. 2018)
  - Francisco Trois, Brazilian chess player
- September 4
  - Gary Duncan, American rock guitarist (Quicksilver Messenger Service) (d. 2019)
  - Greg Elmore, American rock drummer (Quicksilver Messenger Service)
- September 5
  - Dennis Dugan, American actor, director
  - Freddie Mercury, British-Indian singer-songwriter, pianist and frontman of rock band Queen (d. 1991)
  - Loudon Wainwright III, American folk singer-songwriter, humorist and actor
  - Lily Brett, Australian novelist, essayist and poet
- September 6 – Ron Boone, American basketball player
- September 7
  - Willie Crawford, American baseball player (d. 2004)
  - Francisco Varela, Chilean biologist (d. 2001)
- September 8
  - Aziz Sancar, Turkish biochemist, recipient of the Nobel Prize in Chemistry
  - Wong Kan Seng, Singaporean business executive, Deputy Prime Minister of Singapore
- September 9
  - Doug Ingle, American rock vocalist (Iron Butterfly) (d. 2024)
  - Bruce Palmer, Canadian musician (Buffalo Springfield) (d. 2004)
  - Donald Berwick, American government official
  - Poseci Bune, Fijian civil servant, diplomat, politician and Cabinet Minister (d. 2023)
- September 10
  - Michèle Alliot-Marie, French politician
  - Jim Hines, American sprinter (d. 2023)
  - Don Powell, English rock drummer (Slade)
- September 11 – Anthony Browne, British writer and illustrator of children's books
- September 12 – Neil Lyndon, British journalist, writer
- September 13 – Henri Kuprashvili, Georgian swimmer
- September 15
  - Tommy Lee Jones, American actor
  - Tetsu Nakamura, Japanese-Afghan physician (d. 2019)
  - Oliver Stone, American film director, producer (JFK)
  - James Bamford, American author, journalist and documentary producer
  - Rick Blangiardi, American television executive and politician from Hawaii
- September 16 – Camilo Sesto, Spanish singer-songwriter music producer and composer (d. 2019)
- September 17 – Billy Bonds, English footballer and manager (d. 2025)
- September 18
  - Peter Alsop, American musician
  - Akira Kamiya, Japanese voice actor
  - Jean-Luc Brunel, French model scout (d. 2022)
- September 19
  - Connie Kreski, American model (d. 1995)
  - Gerald Brisco, American professional wrestler
- September 20
  - Dorothy Hukill, American politician (d. 2018)
  - Judy Baca, American artist, activist and professor of Chicano studies, world arts and cultures
- September 21
  - Mikhail Kovalchuk, Russian physicist, official
  - Moritz Leuenberger, Swiss Federal Councilor
  - Richard St. Clair, American musician, composer
  - Mart Siimann, Prime Minister of Estonia
- September 22
  - King Sunny Adé, Nigerian jùjú singer, songwriter and multi-instrumentalist
  - Richard Bauckham, English Anglican scholar in theology and New Testament studies
- September 23 – Franz Fischler, Austrian politician
- September 24
  - Lars Emil Johansen, Prime Minister of Greenland
  - María Teresa Ruiz, Chilean astronomer
- September 25
  - Bishan Singh Bedi, Indian cricketer (d. 2023)
  - Felicity Kendal, English actress
  - Jerry Penrod, American bass player
- September 26
  - Andrea Dworkin, American feminist, writer (d. 2005)
  - Togo Igawa, Japanese actor
  - Radha Krishna Mainali, Nepalese politician
  - Christine Todd Whitman, American politician
- September 27 – Nicos Anastasiades, Cypriot businessperson and former president of Cyprus
- September 28 – Jeffrey Jones, American actor
- September 29
  - Shafie Salleh, Malaysian politician (d. 2019)
  - Celso Pitta, Brazilian economist and politician (d. 2009)
- September 30
  - Héctor Lavoe, Puerto Rican singer (d. 1993)
  - Jochen Mass, German racing driver (d. 2025)
  - Claude Vorilhon, French-born 'messenger' of Raëlism
  - Fran Brill, Muppeteer
  - Lee Yock Suan, Minister for Education of Singapore

=== October ===
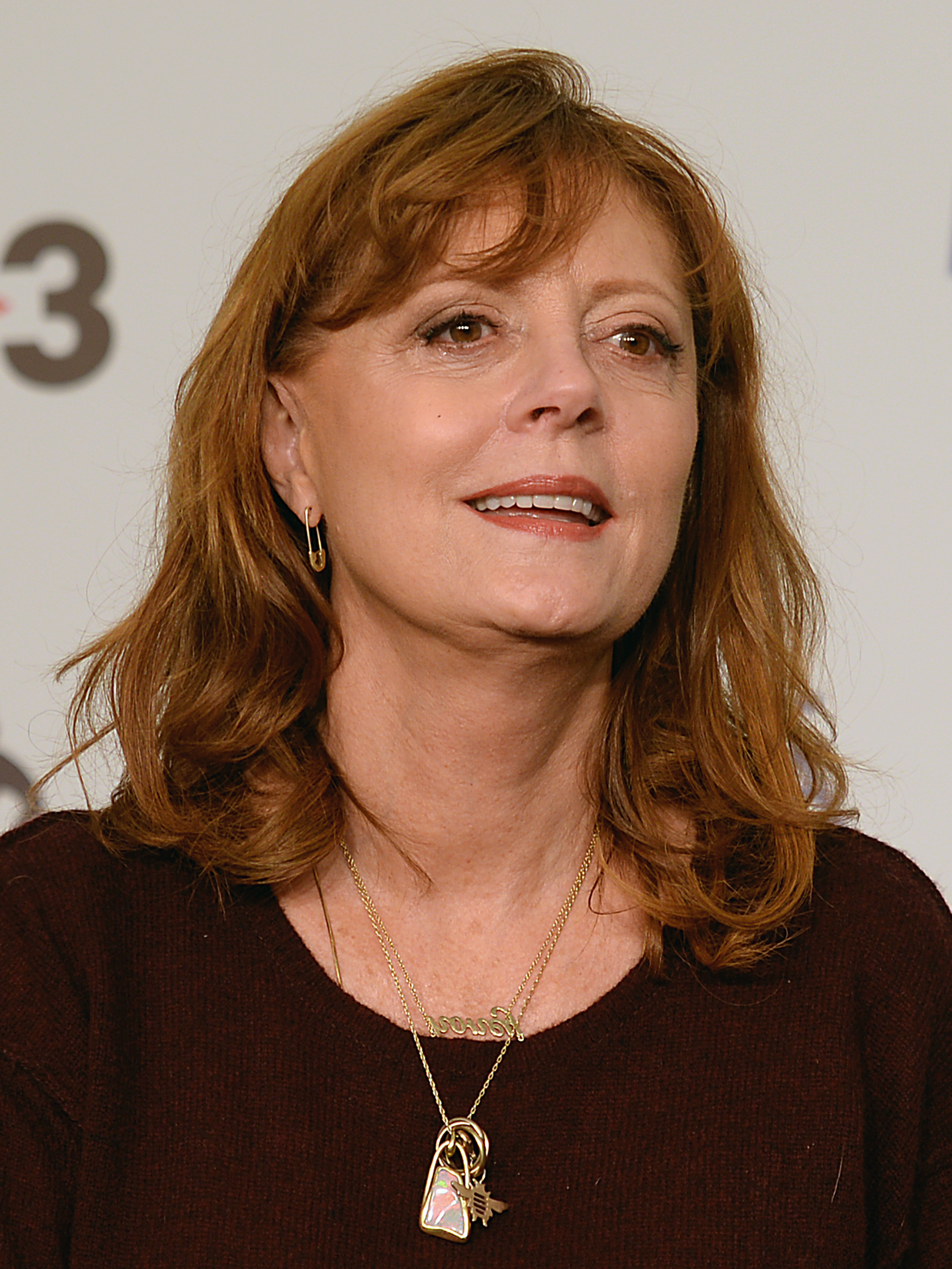
Susan Sarandon

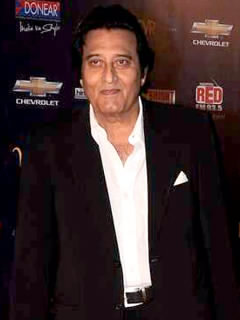
Vinod Khanna

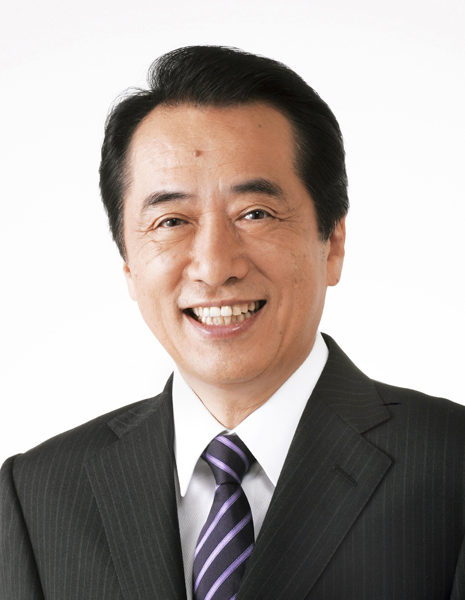
Naoto Kan

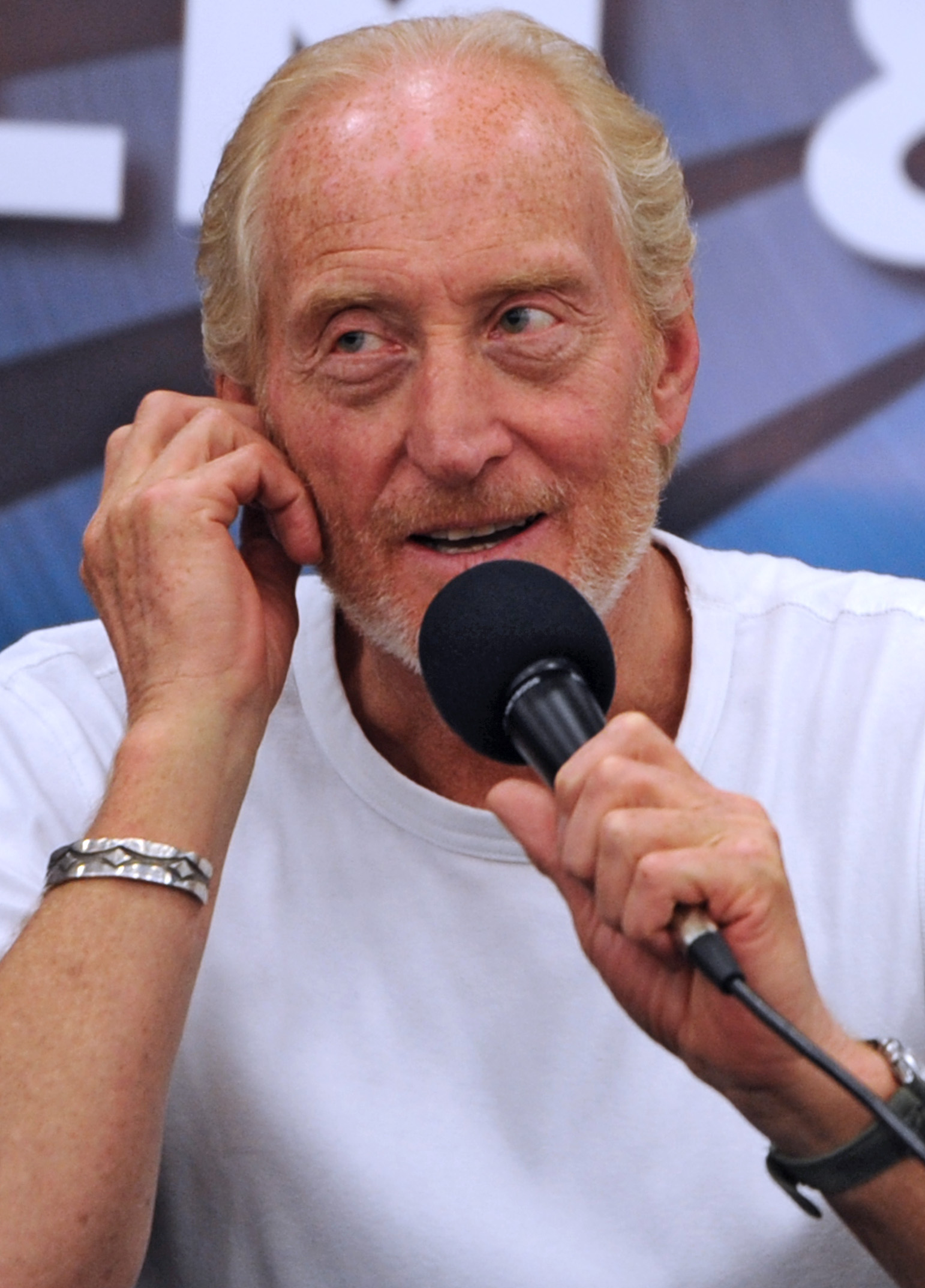
Charles Dance

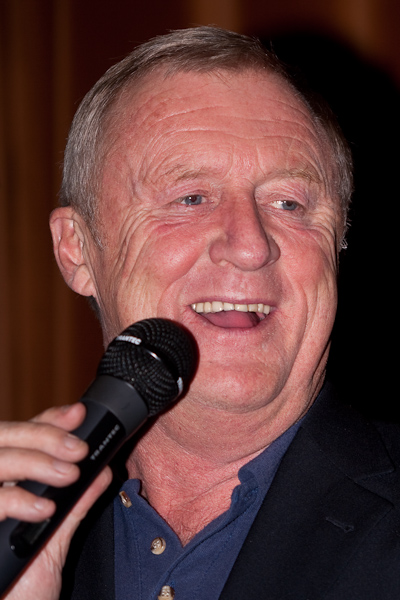
Chris Tarrant

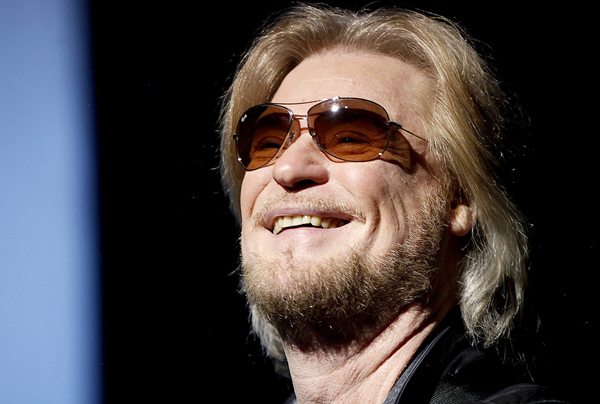
Daryl Hall

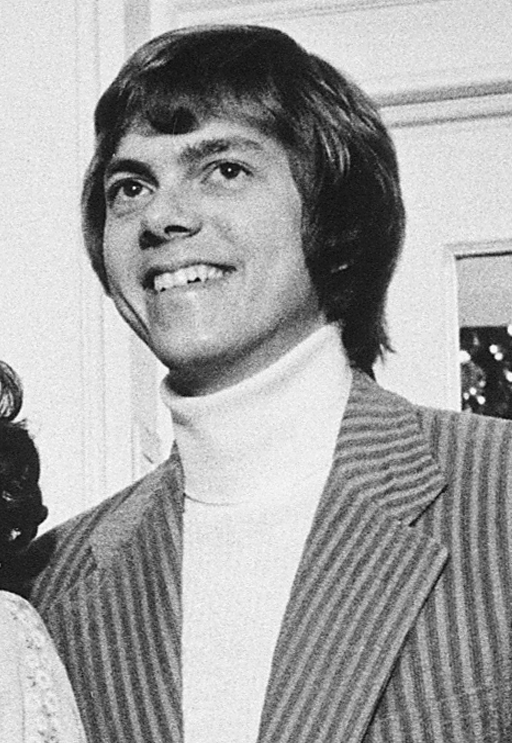
Richard Carpenter

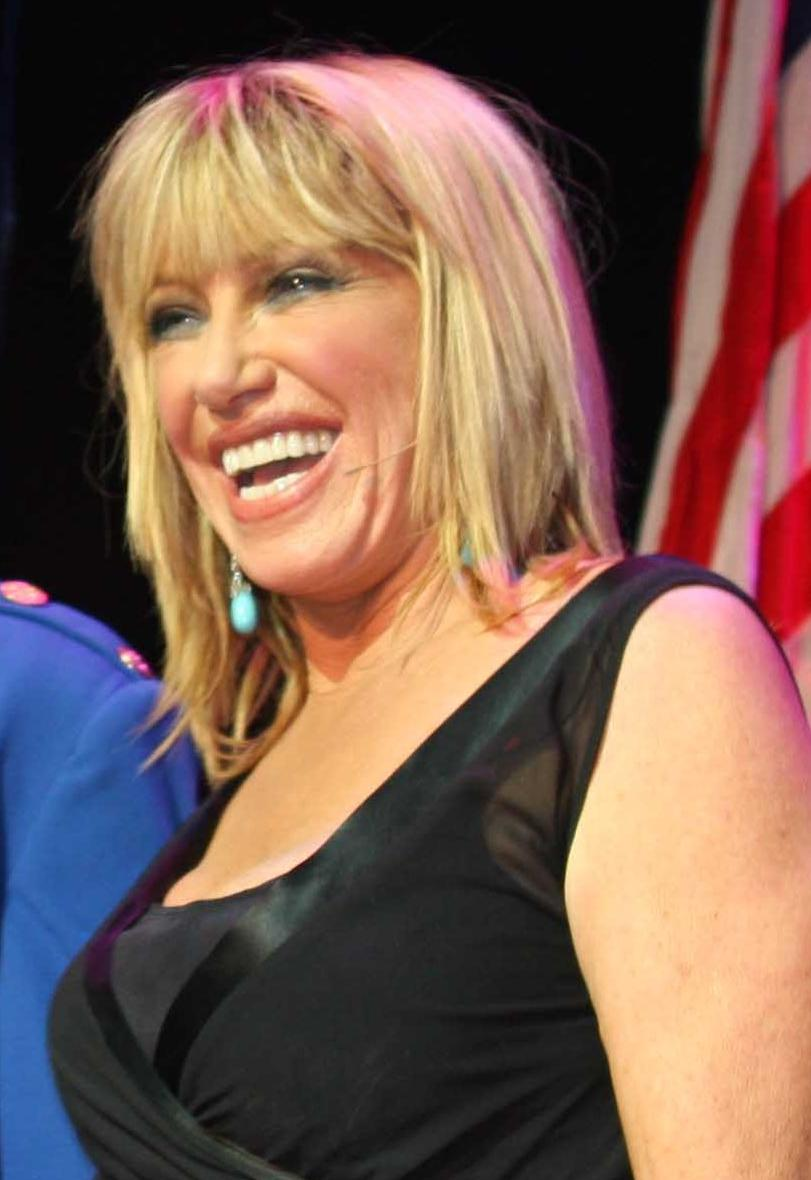
Suzanne Somers

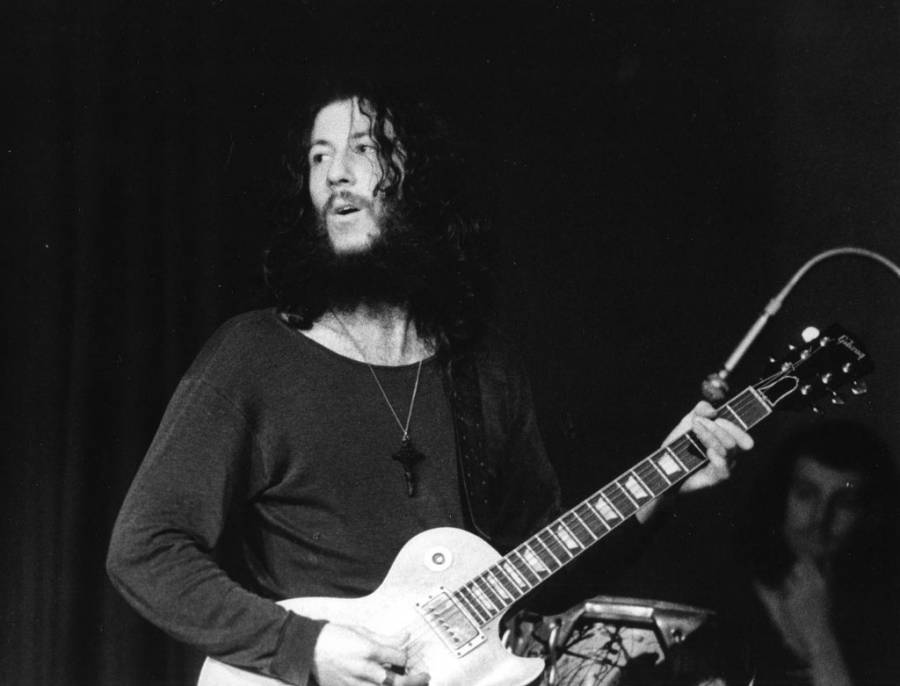
Peter Green

- October 2
  - General Sonthi Boonyaratglin, President of the Council for National Security, Commander-in-Chief of the Royal Thai Army
  - Marie-Georges Pascal, French actress (d. 1985)
- October 3
  - P. P. Arnold, American-British singer
  - Bob Minton, American human rights activist
- October 4
  - Susan Sarandon, American actress
  - Rhie Won-bok, South Korean artist
  - Chuck Hagel, American politician, 24 United States Secretary of Defense
- October 5 – Pacita Abad, Ivatan and Filipino-American artist (d. 2004)
- October 6
  - Lloyd Doggett, American politician
  - Vinod Khanna, Indian actor, producer and politician (d. 2017)
- October 7
  - Nader Al-Dahabi, Prime Minister of Jordan
  - Catharine MacKinnon, American feminist
  - Xue Jinghua, Chinese ballerina
- October 8
  - Hanan Ashrawi, Palestinian scholar, legislator
  - John T. Walton, American son of Wal-Mart founder Sam Walton (d. 2005)
- October 10
  - Anne Boyd, Australian musician
  - Mildred Grieveson, British writer
  - Naoto Kan, 61st Prime Minister of Japan
  - Charles Dance, English actor, screenwriter and film director
  - Chris Tarrant, British radio, TV personality
- October 11
  - Daryl Hall, American rock musician (Hall & Oates)
  - Sawao Katō, Japanese gymnast
  - John D. Bates, United States district judge
- October 12 – Drew Edmondson, American politician
- October 13
  - Edwina Currie, English politician
  - Dorothy Moore, American singer
  - Demond Wilson, African-American actor, minister (Sanford and Son) (d. 2026)
  - H Steven Blum, United States army general
- October 14
  - Craig Venter, American biotechnologist (d. 2026)
  - Dan McCafferty, Scottish rock singer (d. 2022)
  - François Bozizé, President of the Central African Republic
  - Joey de Leon, Filipino actor, host
  - Justin Hayward, English rock singer-songwriter (The Moody Blues)
  - Eli Bebout, American athlete and politician
  - Katy Manning, British actress
- October 15
  - Richard Carpenter, American pop musician, composer (The Carpenters)
  - John Getz, American actor
- October 16
  - Suzanne Somers, American actress, singer (Three's Company) (d. 2023)
  - Elizabeth Witmer, Dutch-born politician
  - Vitaliano Aguirre II, Filipino lawyer and government official
  - Naveen Patnaik , Indian Politician, former Central Minister of Government of India and former Chief Minister of Government of Odisha
- October 17
  - Vicki Hodge, English actress, model
  - Bob Seagren, American athlete, actor
- October 18
  - James Robert Baker, American novelist, screenwriter
  - Howard Shore, Canadian film composer
  - Andrea Zsadon, Hungarian soprano
  - Frank Beamer, retired American college football coach
- October 19 – Philip Pullman, English author
- October 20
  - Marty Gervais, Canadian writer
  - Elfriede Jelinek, Austrian writer, Nobel Prize laureate
- October 21
  - Lyn Allison, Australian politician
  - Lux Interior, American rock musician (The Cramps) (d. 2009)
- October 22
  - Eileen Gordon, British politician
  - Richard McGonagle, American actor
- October 25 – Edith Leyrer, Austrian actress
- October 26 – Pat Sajak, American game-show host (Wheel of Fortune)
- October 27
  - Leslie L. Byrne, American politician
  - Steven R. Nagel, American astronaut (d. 2014)
  - Ivan Reitman, Slovakian-born film director, producer (d. 2022)
- October 28
  - John Hewson, Australian politician
  - Sharon Thesen, Canadian poet
- October 29
  - Peter Green, British musician (d. 2020)
  - Kathryn J. Whitmire, Texas politician; Mayor of Houston, Texas
- October 30
  - Lynne Marta, American actress
  - Andrea Mitchell, American journalist
- October 31 – Stephen Rea, Northern Irish actor

=== November ===
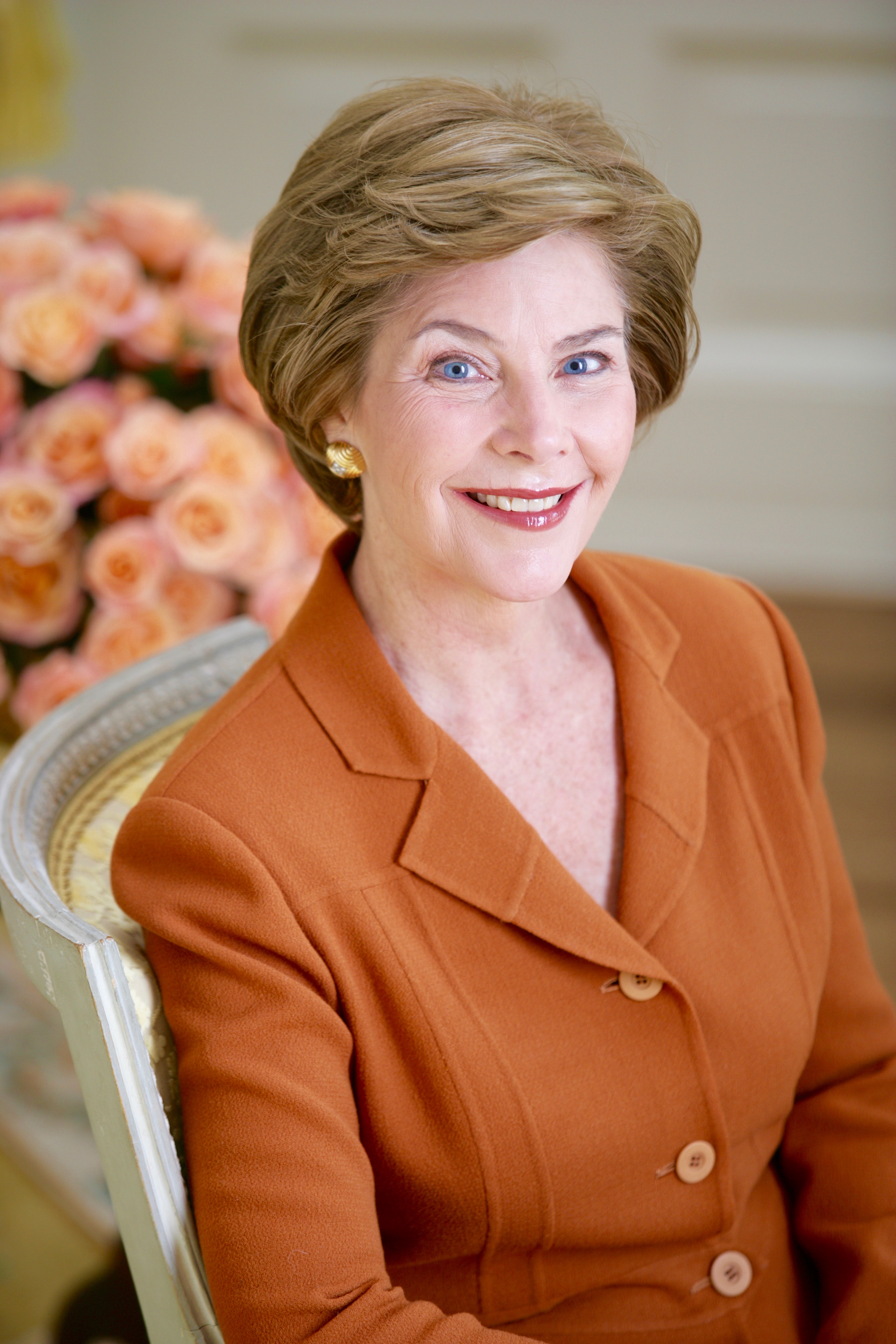
Laura Bush

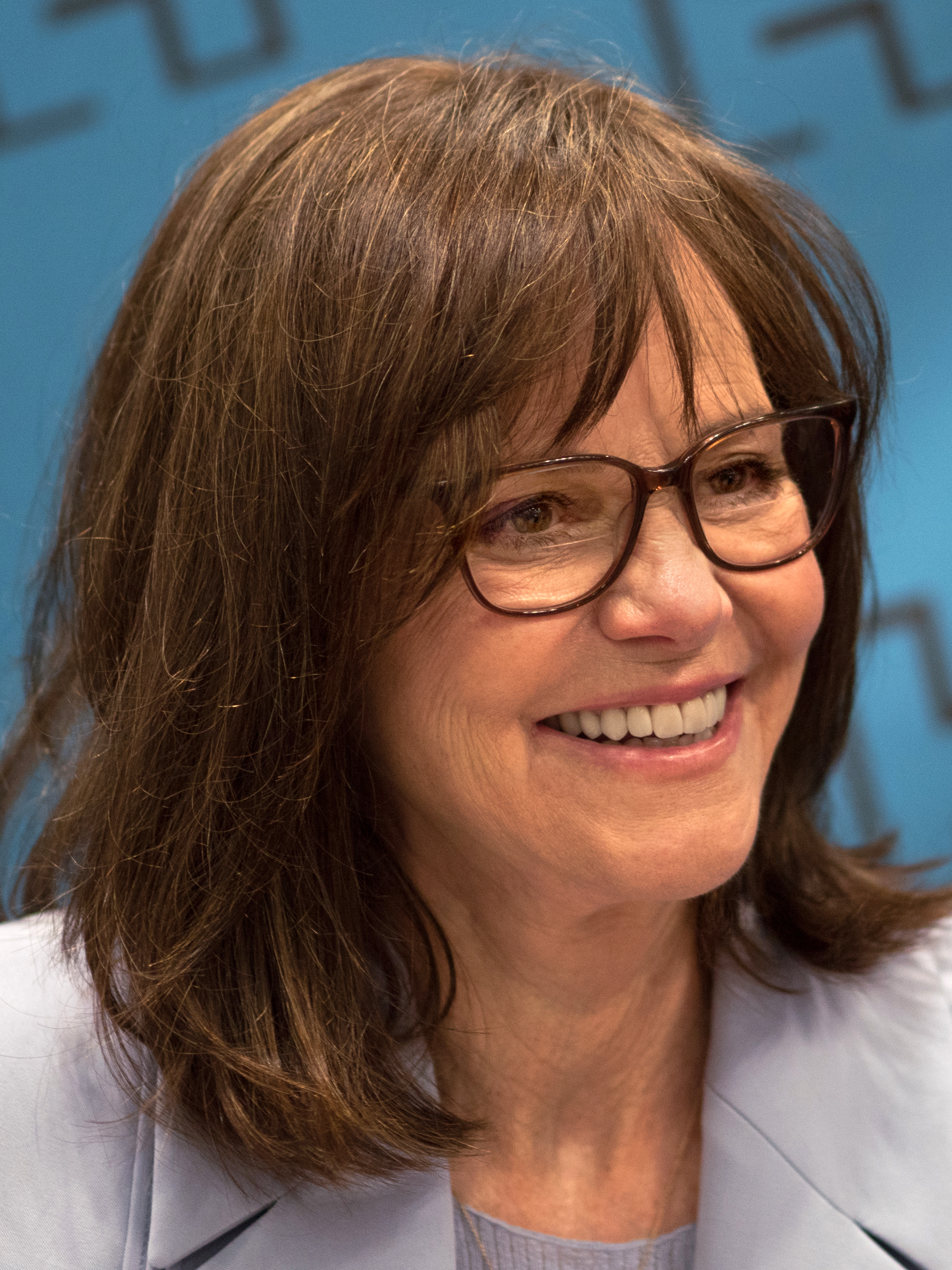
Sally Field

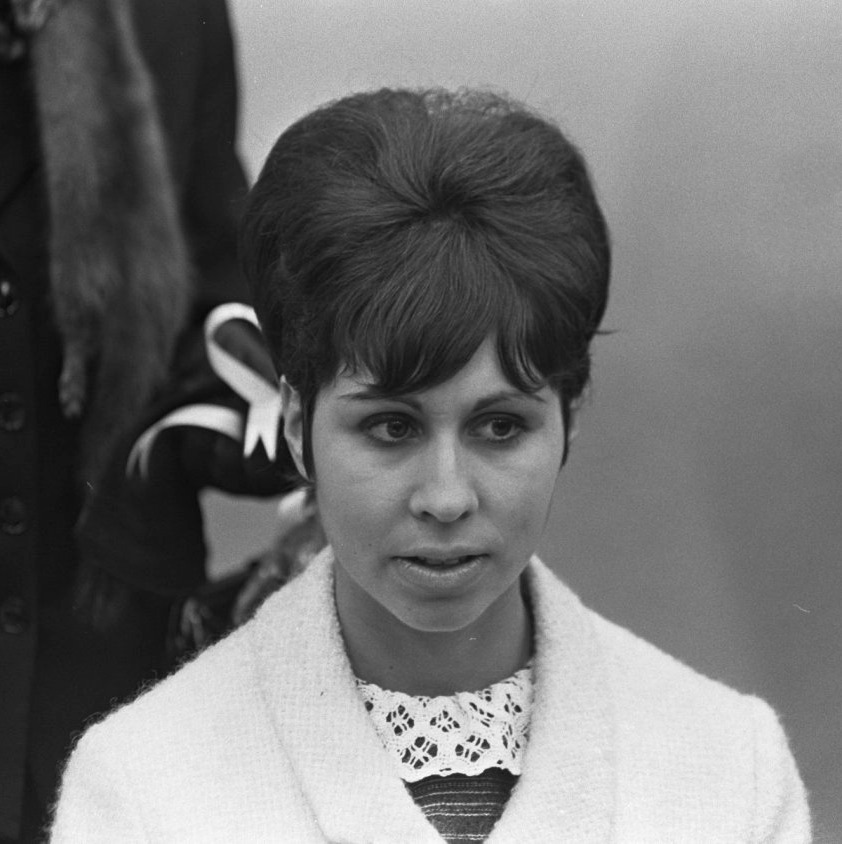
Petra Burka

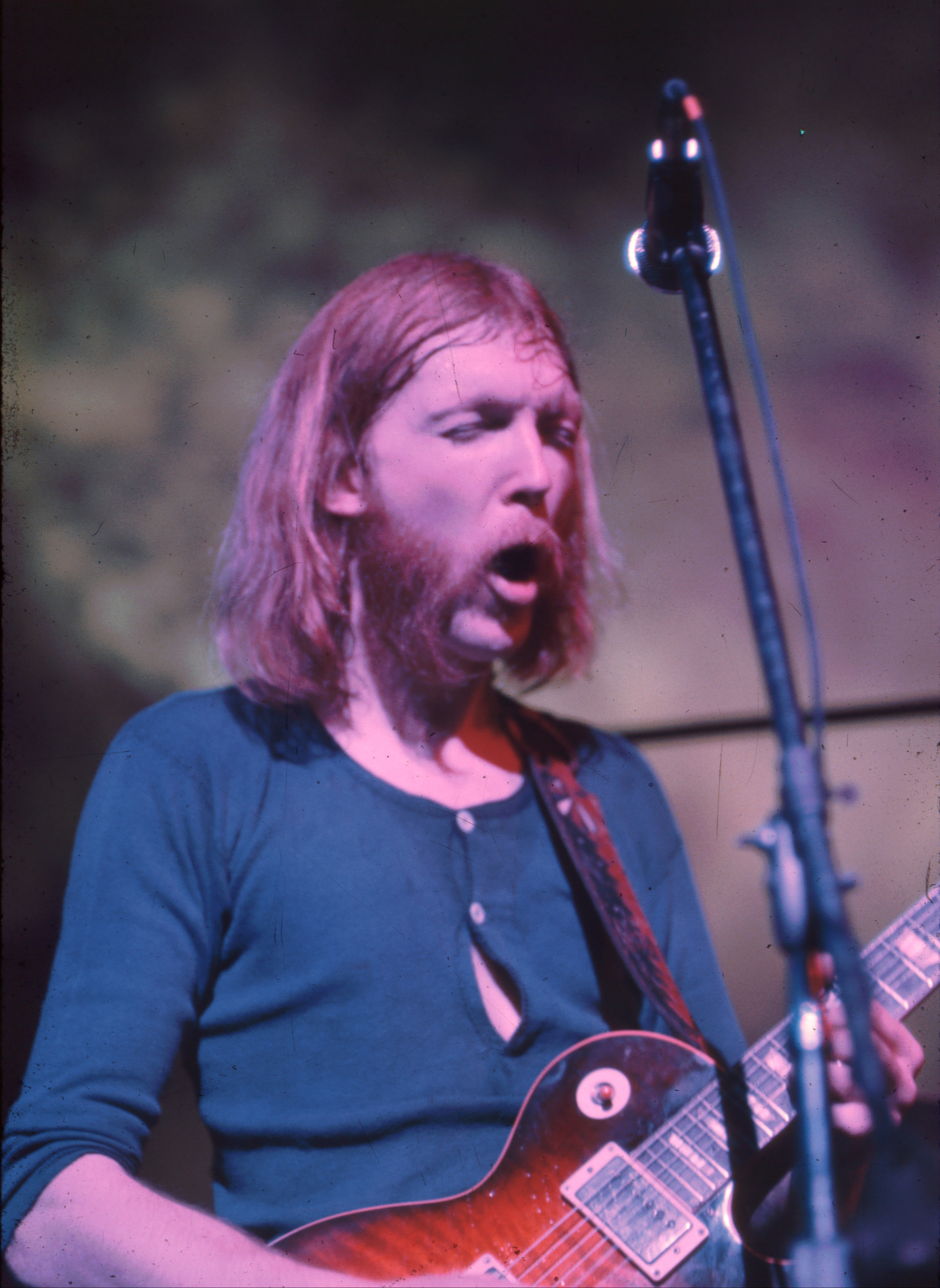
Duane Allman

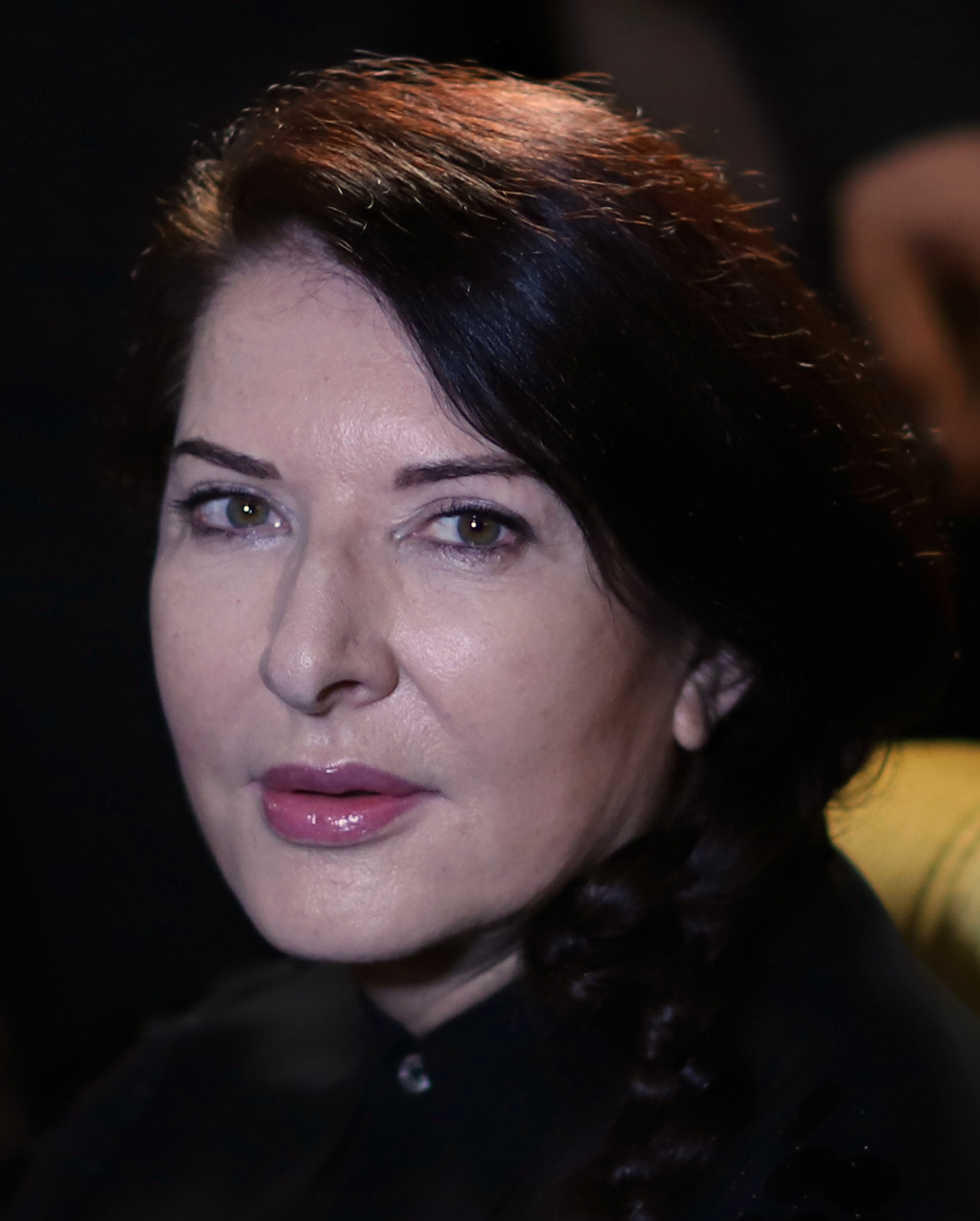
Marina Abramović

- November 1
  - Ric Grech, British rock bassist (d. 1990)
  - Lynne Russell, American newsreader
  - Sucharit Bhakdi, Thai-German microbiologist
- November 2
  - Giuseppe Sinopoli, Italian conductor, composer (d. 2001)
  - Marieta Severo, Brazilian actress
  - Alan Jones, Australian racing driver (Formula One World Champion 1980) (d. 2026)
- November 4
  - Laura Bush, First Lady of the United States
  - Les Lannom, American actor, musician
  - Robert Mapplethorpe, American photographer (d. 1989)
- November 5
  - Herman Brood, Dutch artist (d. 2001)
  - Loleatta Holloway, American singer (d. 2011)
  - Gram Parsons, American musician (d. 1973)
- November 6
  - Sally Field, American actress, singer (The Flying Nun)
  - George Young, Scottish, Australian singer, songwriter, musician (The Easybeats) (d. 2017)
  - Peter Ackerman, American businessman (d. 2022)
- November 7 – Diane Francis, Canadian journalist
- November 8
  - Stella Chiweshe, Zimbabwean musician
  - John Farrar, Australian guitarist and singer-songwriter (The Shadows; Marvin, Welch & Farrar)
  - Guus Hiddink, Dutch football player, manager
  - Stefan Weber, Austrian singer (d. 2018)
- November 10 – Alaina Reed Hall, American actress (d. 2009)
- November 11
  - Roger A. Brady, United States Air Force general
  - Corrine Brown, American politician
- November 12
  - James F. Amos, 35th commandant of the Marine Corps
- November 13
  - Ohara Reiko, Japanese actress
  - Stanisław Barańczak, Polish poet, literary critic, scholar, editor, translator and lecturer (d. 2014)
- November 14 – Bharathan, Indian filmmaker, artist and art director (d. 1998)
- November 15
  - Gwyneth Powell, British actress (d. 2022)
  - Sandy Skoglund, American photographer
- November 16
  - David Brandt, American farmer (d. 2023)
  - Mahasti, Iranian singer (d. 2007)
  - Terence McKenna, American writer, philosopher, ethnobotanist and shaman (d. 2000)
  - Jo Jo White, American basketball player (d. 2018)
- November 17
  - Petra Burka, Canadian figure skater
  - Martin Barre, English guitarist
  - Terry Branstad, American politician and diplomat
  - John Spencer, American politician and senate candidate against Hillary Clinton in 2006
- November 18
  - Andrea Allan, Scottish actress
  - Alan Dean Foster, American novelist
- November 20
  - Duane Allman, American rock guitarist, co-founder and leader of the Allman Brothers Band (d. 1971)
  - Samuel E. Wright, American actor and singer (d. 2021)
- November 21
  - Emma Cohen, Spanish actress
  - Chaviva Hošek, Czech-born feminist
  - Jacky Lafon, Belgian actress
  - Marina Warner, English writer
- November 22
  - Aston "Family Man" Barrett, Jamaican reggae musician (d. 2024)
  - Anne Wheeler, Canadian screen director
  - Gary Hilton, American serial killer
- November 23
  - Diana Quick, English actress
  - Bobby Rush, African-American politician, activist and pastor
- November 24 – Ted Bundy, American serial killer (d. 1989)
- November 25
  - Atiku Abubakar, 11th Vice President of Nigeria
  - Marika Lindström, Swedish actress
  - Marc Brown, American author and illustrator of children's books
- November 26 – Ottilia Borbáth, Romanian-born Hungarian actress
- November 27
  - Richard Codey, American politician, 53rd Governor of New Jersey
  - Nina Maslova, Russian actress
- November 28 – Regina Braga, Brazilian actress
- November 29
  - Brian Cadd, Australian singer-songwriter
  - Suzy Chaffee, American singer, actress
- November 30
  - Marina Abramović, Yugoslavian performance artist
  - Barbara Cubin, U.S. Congresswoman from Wyoming
  - Jeffrey Boam, American screenwriter and film producer (d. 2000)

=== December ===
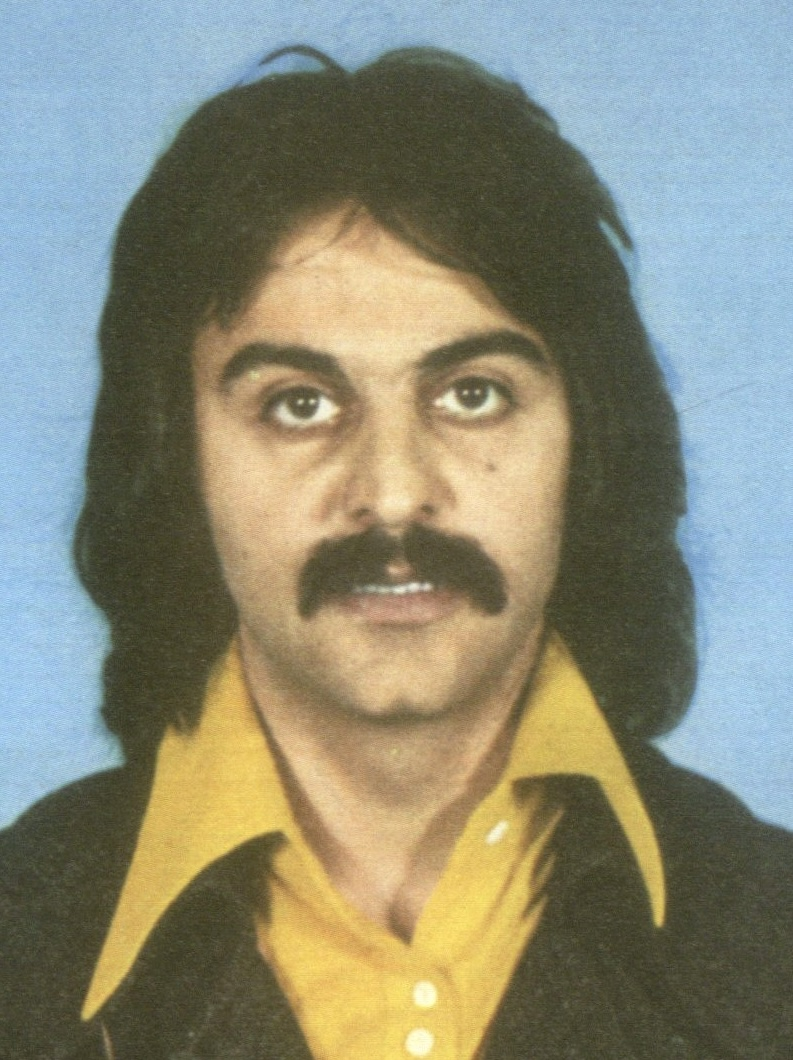
Kourosh Yaghmaei

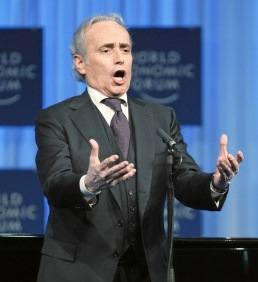
José Carreras

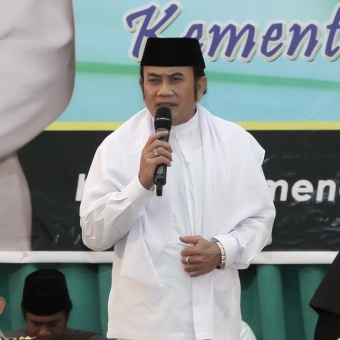
Rhoma Irama

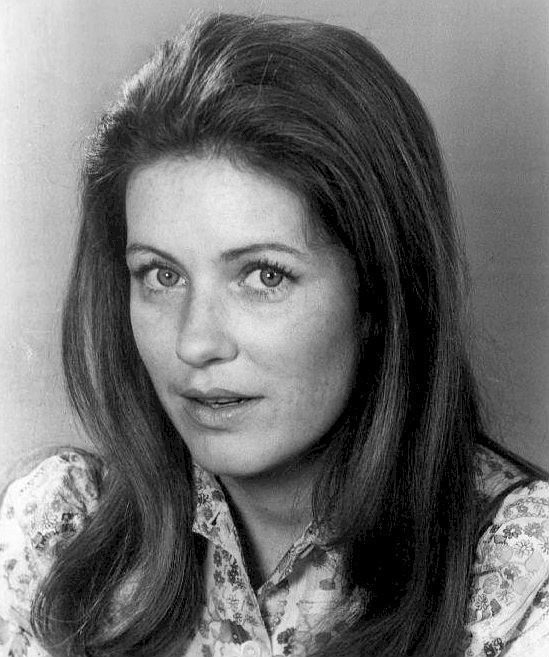
Patty Duke

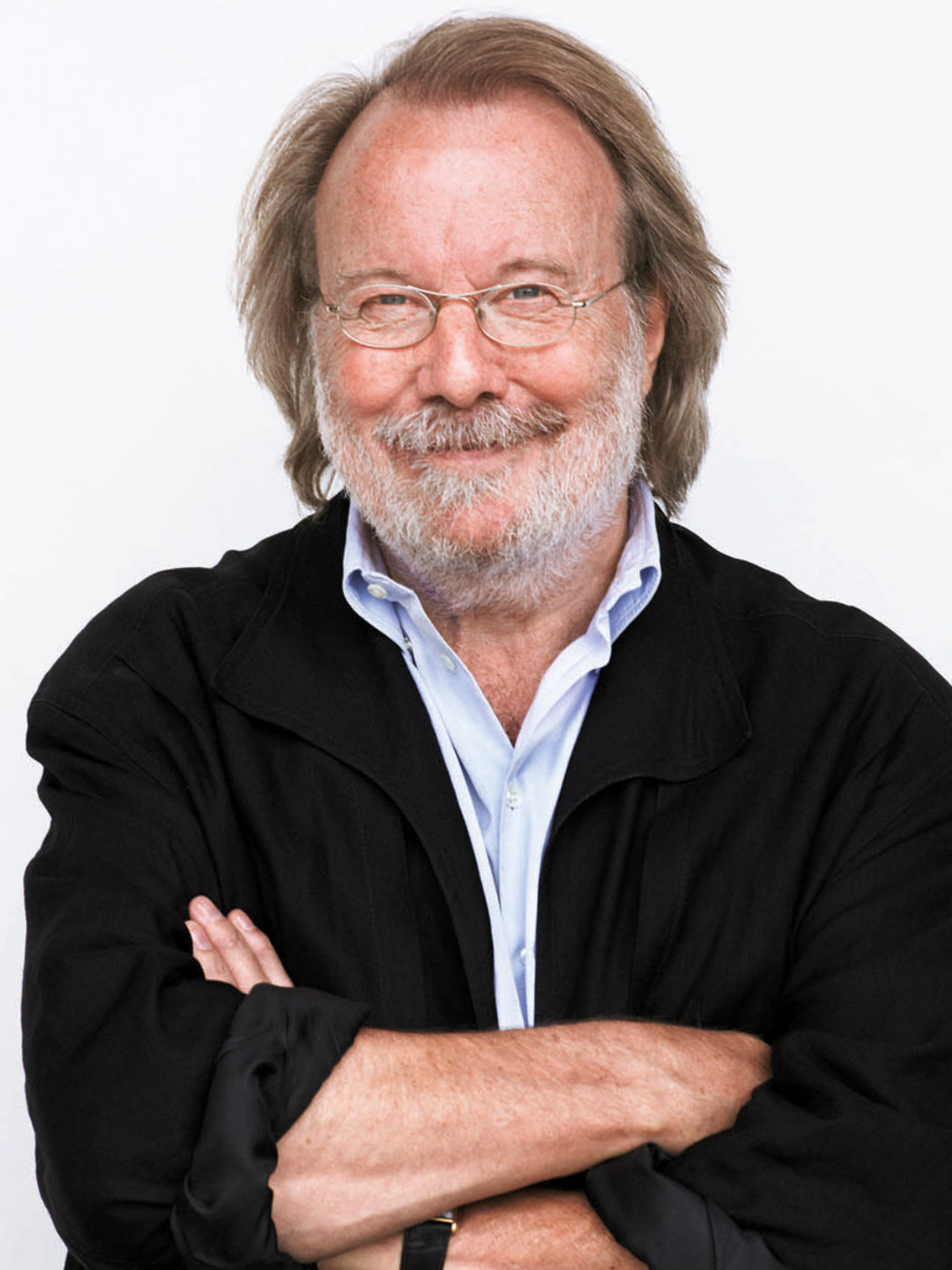
Benny Andersson

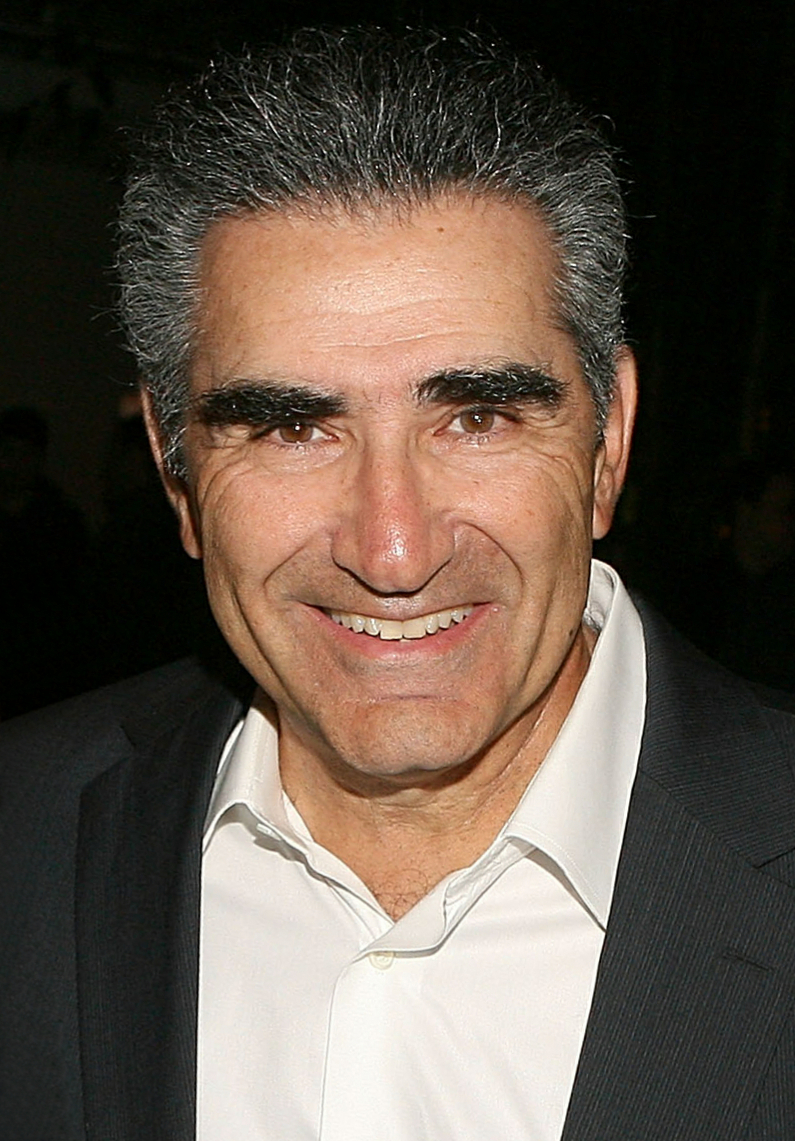
Eugene Levy

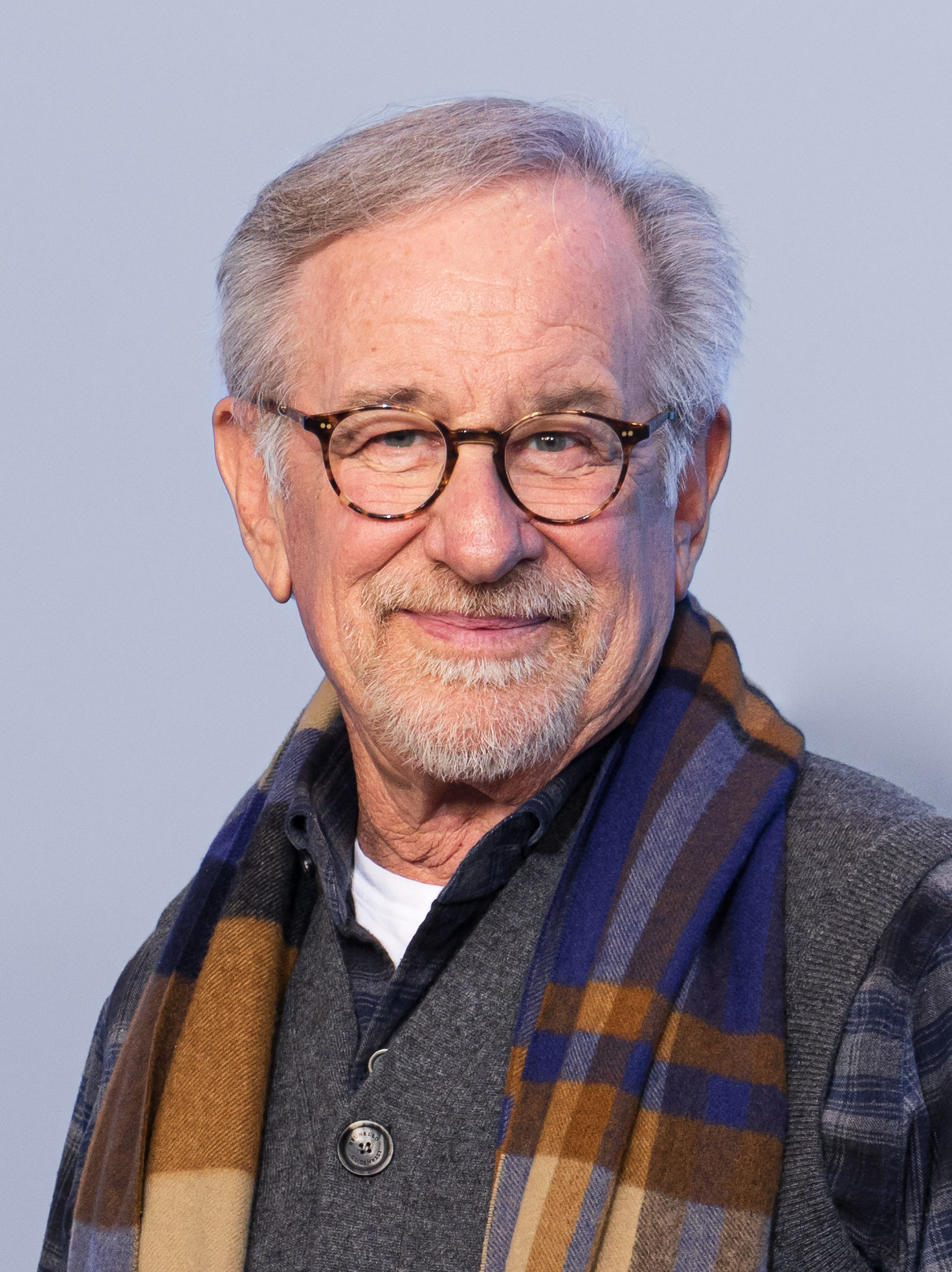
Steven Spielberg

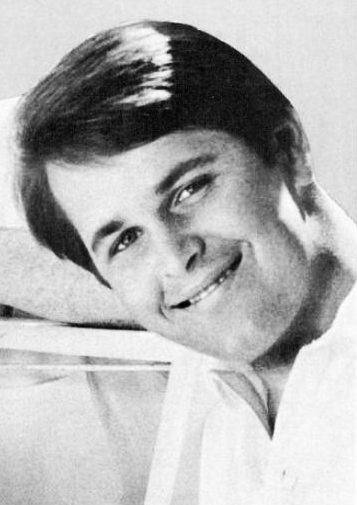
Carl Wilson

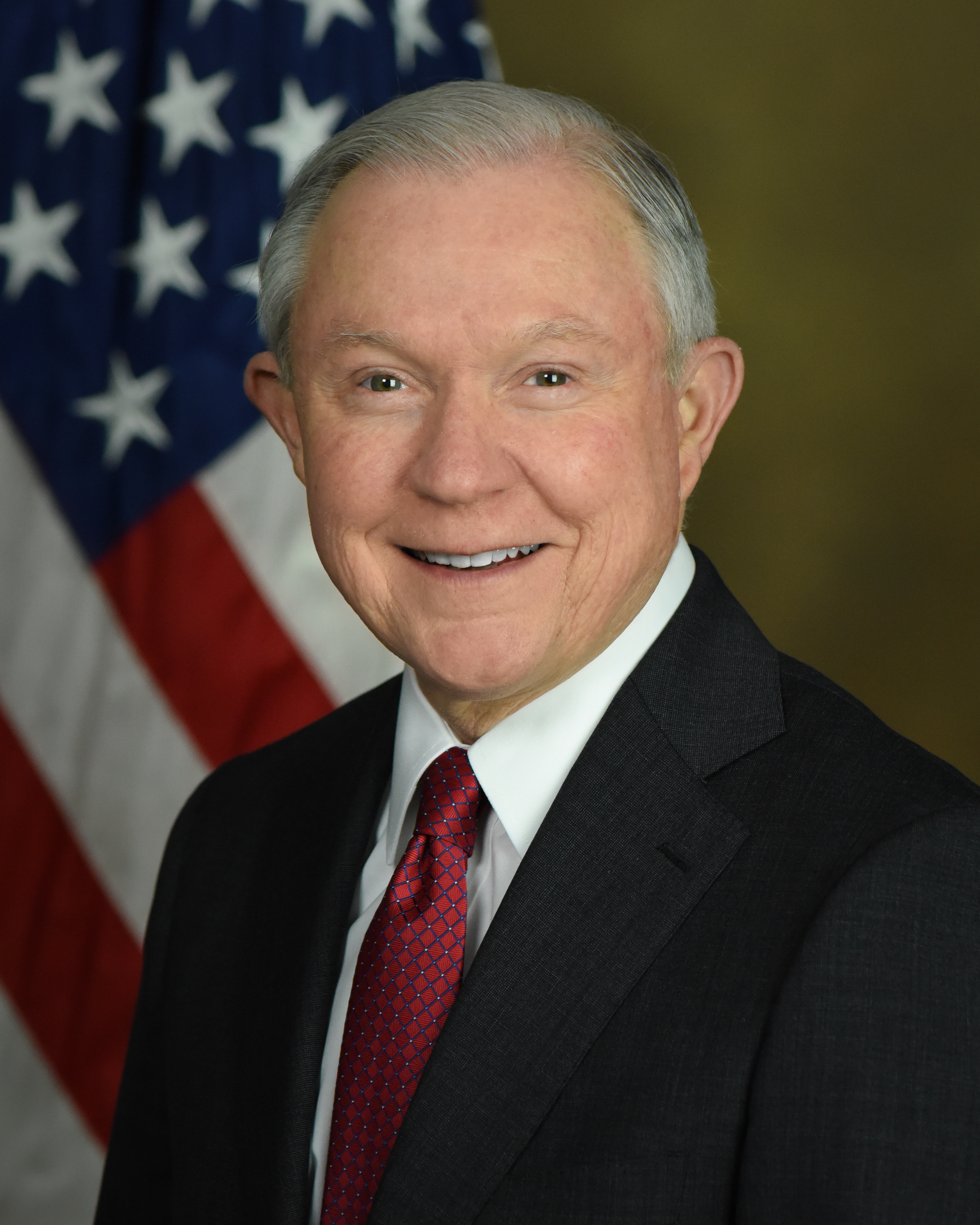
Jeff Sessions

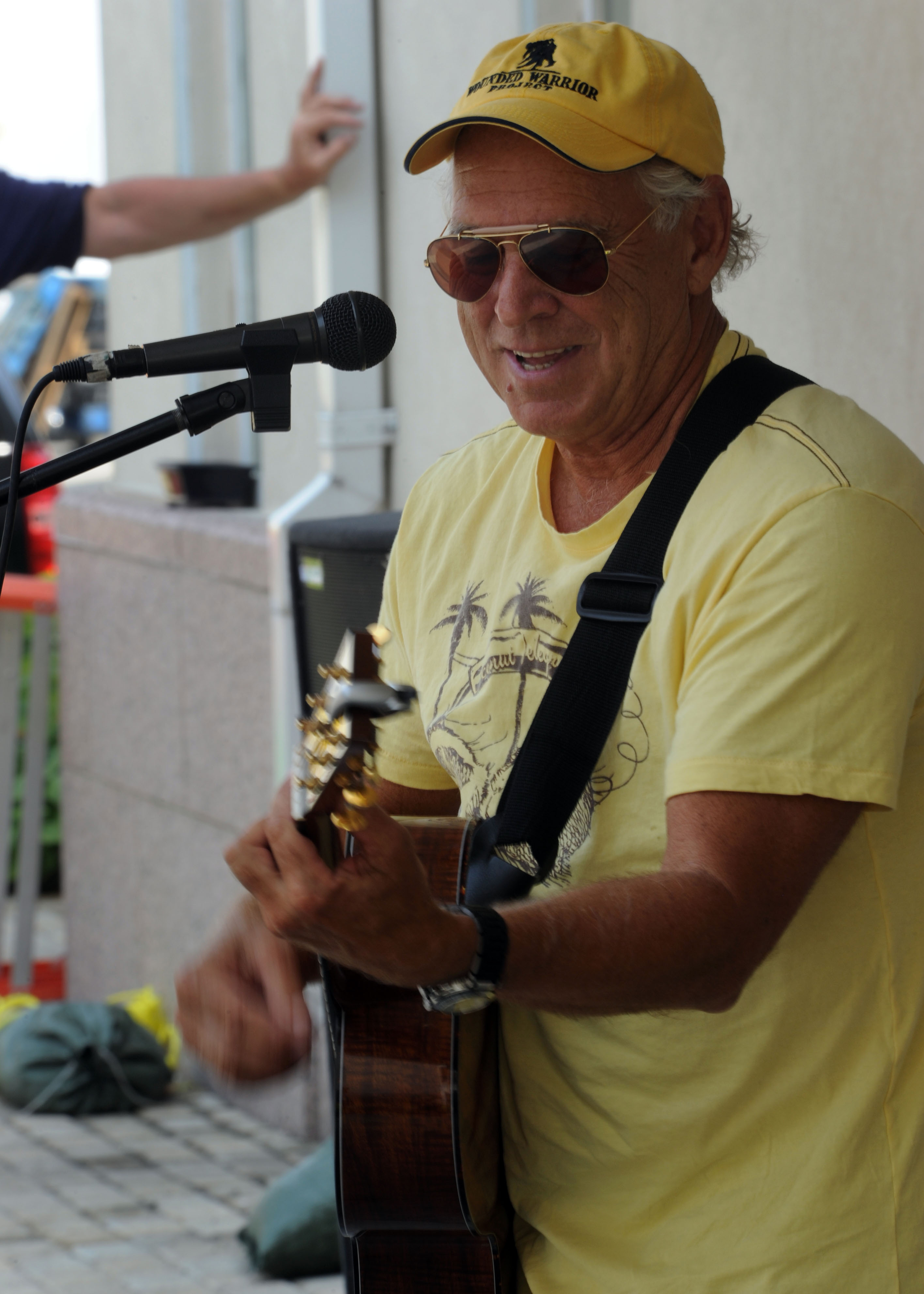
Jimmy Buffett

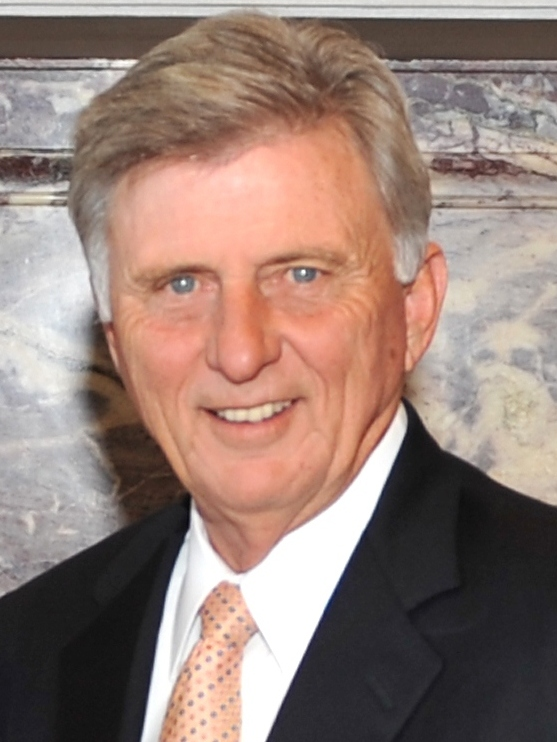
Mike Beebe

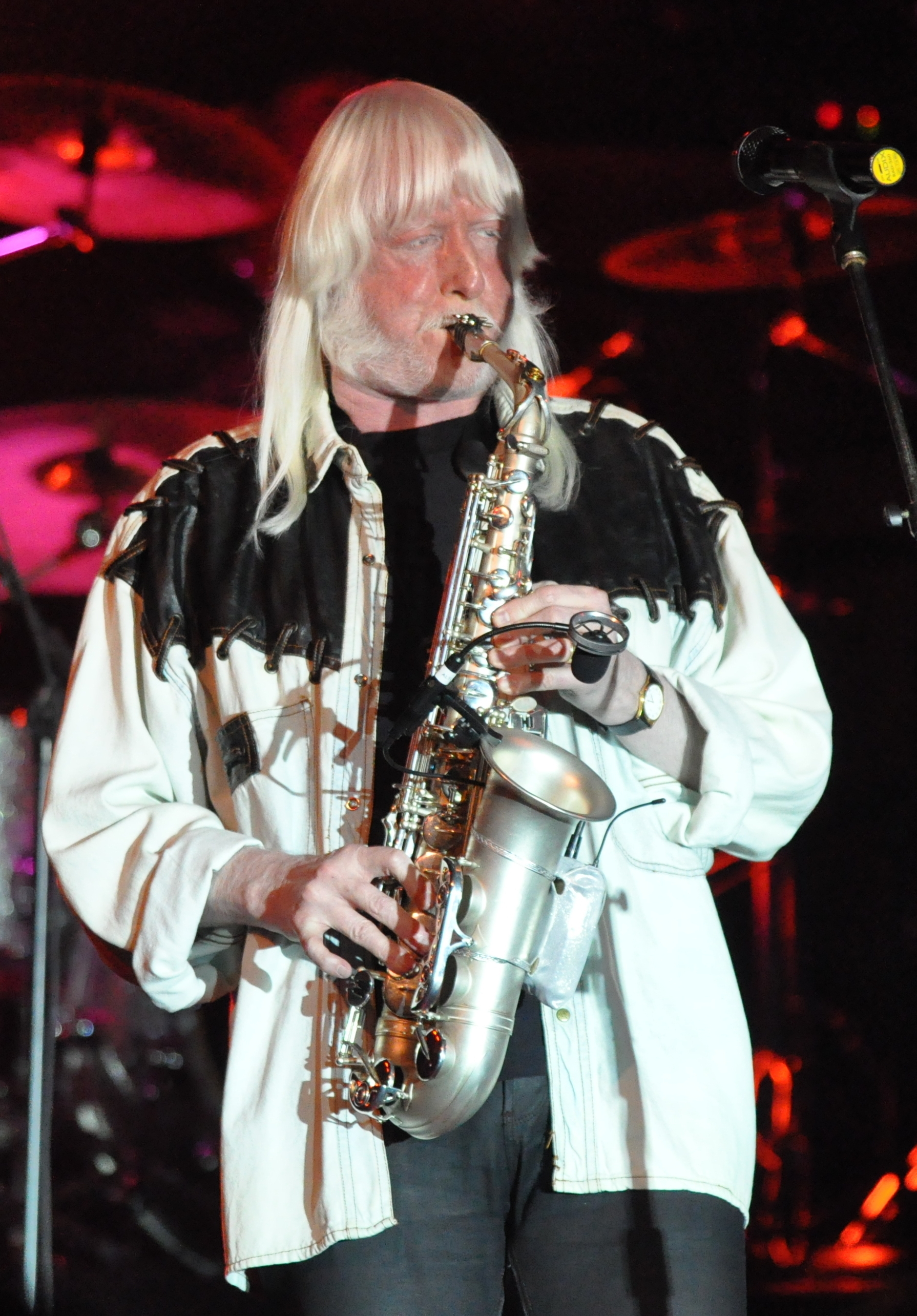
Edgar Winter

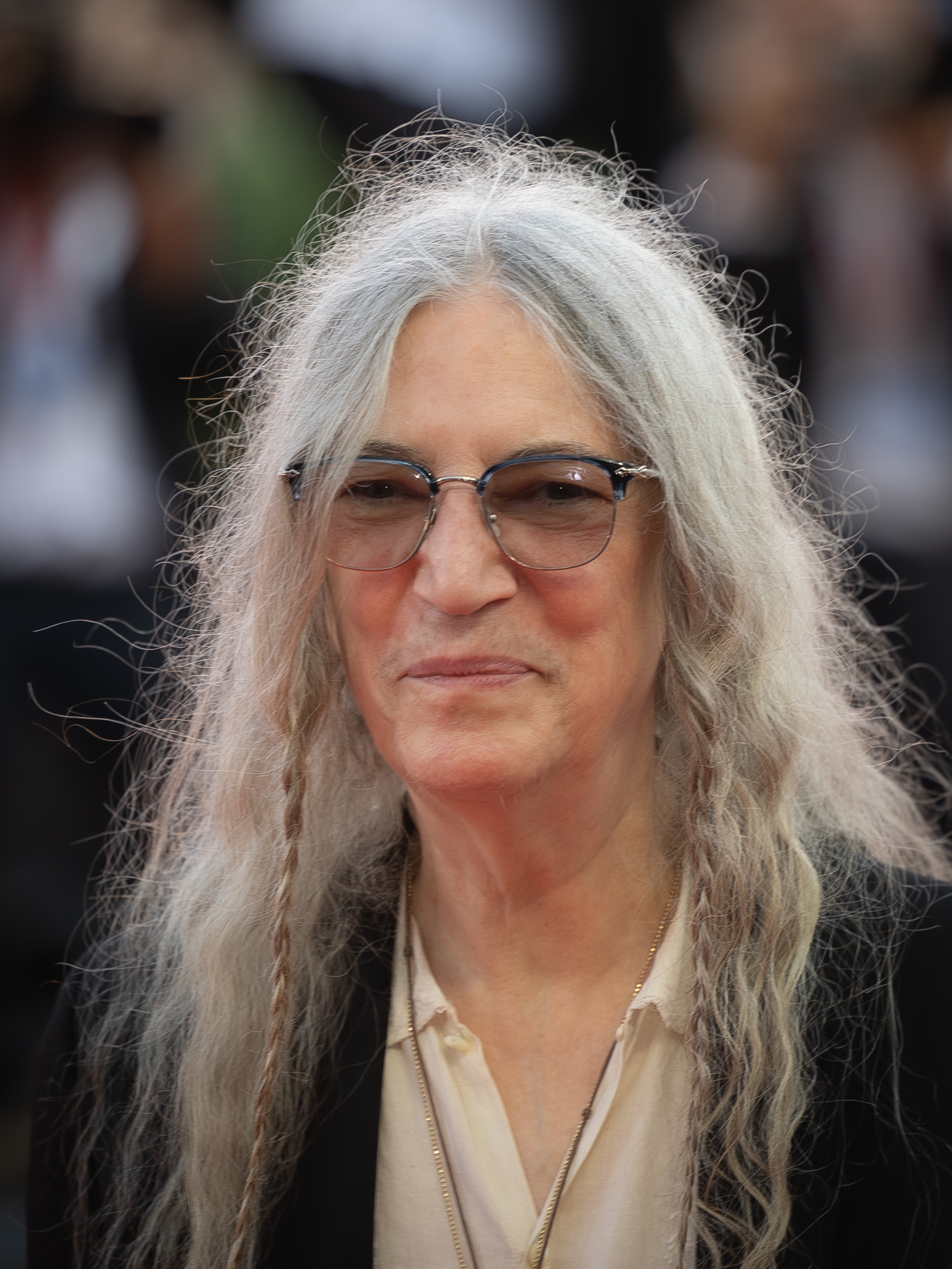
Patti Smith

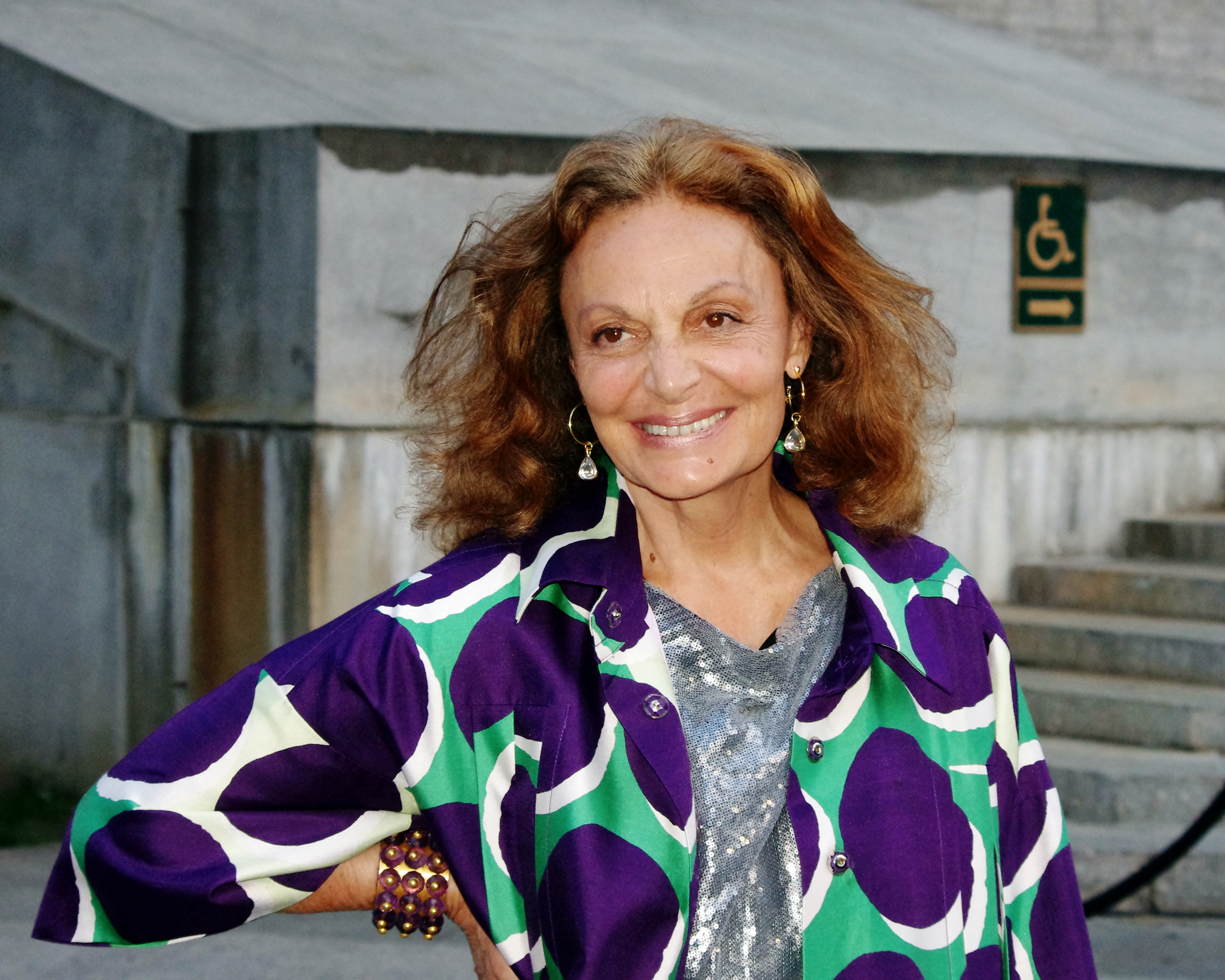
Diane von Fürstenberg

- December 1 – Jonathan Katz, American comedian, actor and voice actor
- December 2
  - Gianni Versace, Italian fashion designer (d. 1997)
  - John Banks, New Zealand politician
- December 3
  - Kourosh Yaghmaei, Iranian singer-songwriter, composer, record producer and guitarist
  - Marjana Lipovšek, Slovenian singer, actress
  - Joop Zoetemelk, Dutch cyclist
  - Allan Bérubé, American historian, activist, scholar, researcher and author (d. 2007)
- December 4
  - Sherry Alberoni, American actress, voice artist
  - Yō Inoue, Japanese voice actress (d. 2003)
  - Karina, Spanish singer/actress
  - Angela Browning, British politician
- December 5
  - José Carreras, Spanish tenor
  - Gloria Comesaña, Spanish philosopher (d. 2024)
  - Eva-Britt Svensson, Swedish politician
  - Rodney Alexander, American politician
- December 6
  - Roger Hoy, English footballer (d. 2018)
  - Nancy Brinker, American health activist, diplomat
- December 8
  - Jacques Bourboulon, French photographer
  - John Rubinstein, American actor
  - Sharmila Tagore, Indian actress
  - Chava Alberstein, Israeli musician, lyricist, composer and arranger
  - Rani Begum, Pakistani actress and model (d. 1993)
- December 9 – Sonia Gandhi, Indian politician
- December 10
  - Chrystos, American poet
  - Thomas Lux, American poet
  - John W. Birks, American atmospheric chemist and entrepreneur
- December 11
  - Rhoma Irama, Indonesian dangdut musician, actor and politician
  - Susan Kyle, American writer
  - Ellen Meloy, American writer (d. 2004)
- December 12
  - Emerson Fittipaldi, Brazilian racing car driver
  - Gloria Loring, American singer
  - Don Gummer, American sculptor
- December 13
  - Nicholas Kollerstrom, British writer
  - Heather North, American actress (d. 2017)
- December 14
  - Antony Beevor, English historian
  - Jane Birkin, English actress and singer (d. 2023)
  - Jobriath, American musician and actor (d. 1983)
  - Patty Duke, American actress (d. 2016)
  - Lynne Marie Stewart, American actress (d. 2025)
  - Michael Ovitz, American talent agent, co-founder of Creative Artists Agency
  - Leon Botstein, Swiss-born American conductor, educator and scholar
- December 15
  - Carmine Appice, American rock drummer
  - Rodney Bingenheimer, American radio disc jockey
- December 16
  - Benny Andersson, Swedish rock singer-songwriter (ABBA)
  - Alice Aycock, American sculptor
  - Trevor Pinnock, English harpsichordist, conductor
  - Rick Bartow, Native American artist, a member of the Mad River band (d. 2016)
  - Toofan, Iranian singer (d. 2012)
- December 17
  - Eugene Levy, Canadian actor, comedian and director (Second City Television)
  - Bel Mooney, English broadcast journalist
  - Jayne Eastwood, Canadian actress, voice actress
  - Suresh Oberoi, Indian actor
- December 18
  - Steve Biko, South African anti-apartheid activist (d. 1977)
  - Nina Škottová, Czech politician, member of the European Parliament
  - Steven Spielberg, American filmmaker
- December 19
  - Candace Pert, American neuroscientist
  - Robert Urich, American actor (d. 2002)
- December 20
  - Uri Geller, Israeli illusionist
  - Lesley Judd, English television presenter
  - Sonny Perdue, American politician, 81st Governor of Georgia, 31st U.S. Secretary of Agriculture
  - John Spencer, American actor (d. 2005)
  - Dick Wolf, American television producer
- December 21
  - Brian Davison, Rhodesian cricketer, Tasmanian politician
  - Carl Wilson, American musician (The Beach Boys) (d. 1998)
  - Cherie Berry, American politician
  - Robert D. Bullard, American academic, activist and professor
- December 22 – Kuwasi Balagoon, American political activist, anarchist and member of the Black Panther Party and Black Liberation Army (d. 1986)
- December 23
  - Edita Gruberová, Slovakian soprano (d. 2021)
  - Susan Lucci, American actress (All My Children)
  - John Sullivan, English television scriptwriter (d. 2011)
- December 24
  - Jan Akkerman, Dutch rock guitarist (Focus)
  - Roselyne Bachelot-Narquin, French politician, member of the European Parliament
  - Brenda Howard, American bisexual activist (d. 2005)
  - Jeff Sessions, American politician, United States Attorney General
- December 25 – Jimmy Buffett, American rock singer-songwriter (d. 2023)
- December 26 – Jean-Noël Prade, French University President
- December 27 – Janet Street-Porter, English broadcast journalist
- December 28
  - Mike Beebe, American politician and attorney
  - Edgar Winter, American rock musician
  - Miriam Batucada, Brazilian singer, composer and TV presenter (d. 1994)
- December 29
  - Marianne Faithfull, English singer and actress (d. 2025)
  - Ruth Shady, Peruvian archaeologist
  - Arturo Brion, Filipino judge
- December 30
  - Patti Smith, American poet, singer
  - Berti Vogts, German football player and manager
  - Barry Alvarez, American former college football coach and athletic director
- December 31
  - Diane von Fürstenberg, Belgian-American fashion designer
  - Lyudmila Pakhomova, Soviet ice dancer (d. 1986)
  - Margaret Travolta, American actress

=== Date unknown ===
- Ali Abu Al-Ragheb, Prime Minister of Jordan
- Jang Song-thaek, North Korean politician (d. 2013)
- Miklós Lukáts, Hungarian politician (d. 2022)
- Afsaneh Najmabadi, Iranian historian, gender theorist
- Raul Bragança Neto, 8th Prime Minister of São Tomé and Príncipe (d. 2014)
- Daoud Abdel Sayed, Egyptian director and screenwriter
- Mari Carmen Aponte, American attorney and diplomat
- Terence Anderson, Australian-born American sports shooter
- Alun Armstrong, English character actor
- Dennis Ashbaugh, American painter
- Ewart Brown, Bermudian politician and ninth Premier of Bermuda
- Ted Baehr, American media critic and chairman of the Christian Film and Television Commission
- Wilhelm Barthlott, German botanist and biomimetic materials scientist
- Jean-Paul Béraudo, French lawyer, academic and author of legal works
- Sonia Berjman, Argentinian urban and landscape historian and researcher on the history of Buenos Aires
- Omar Blondin Diop, West-African anti-imperialist philosopher, artist and revolutionary (d. 1973)
- Bob Bossin, Canadian folk singer (Stringband), writer and activist
- Danièle Bourcier, French lawyer and essayist
- Martin Bresnick, American composer
- Robert Bringhurst, Canadian poet, typographer and author
- Nathaniel Burkett, American serial killer (d. 2021)
- Corwin Clairmont, printmaker and installation artist

== Deaths ==
=== January ===
- January 1 – Georgina Sweet, Australian zoologist and women's rights activist (b. 1875)
- January 2
  - Fabijan Abrantovich, Soviet civic, religious leader (b. 1884)
  - Joe Darling, Australian cricketer (b. 1870)
  - Eleanor Rathbone, British politician and long-term campaigner for family allowance and for women's rights (d. 1872)
- January 3 – William Joyce, Irish-born American World War II Nazi propaganda broadcaster known as "Lord Haw-Haw" (executed) (b. 1906)
- January 4
  - George Woolf, Canadian jockey (b. 1910)
  - Friedrich von Bodelschwingh, German pastor, theologian and public health advocate (b. 1877)
- January 5
  - Kitty Cheatham, American singer (b. 1864)
  - Einar af Wirsén, Swedish Army officer, diplomat and writer (b. 1875)
  - Slim Summerville, American film actor and director (b. 1892)
- January 6
  - Dion Fortune, British writer (b. 1890)
  - Georg, Prince of Saxe-Meiningen (b. 1892)
  - Slim Summerville, American actor (b. 1892)
  - Ferenc Szálasi, Hungarian military officer, politician and leader of the fascist Arrow Cross Party (executed) (b. 1897)
- January 8
  - Harold Cole, petty criminal, British soldier, operative of Pat O'Leary escape line, and agent of Nazi Germany (b. 1906)
  - Thomas Barbour, American herpetologist (b. 1884)
  - Guy Carleton, career officer in the United States Army (b. 1857)
- January 9
  - Countee Cullen, American poet (b. 1903)
  - Sir Nevil Macready, British army general, police commissioner (b. 1862)
- January 10
  - László Bárdossy, Hungarian diplomat, politician and 33rd Prime Minister of Hungary (executed) (b. 1890)
  - Matti Turkia, Finnish politician (b. 1871)
  - Harry Von Tilzer, American songwriter (b. 1872)
- January 13 – Wilhelm Souchon, German admiral (b. 1864)
- January 14
  - Theodore M. Stuart, American football player and coach (b. 1883)
  - Maurice Koechlin, Franco-Swiss structural engineer from the Koechlin family. (b. 1856)
- January 15 – Karl Nabersberg, German youth leader (b. 1908)
- January 18 – Wilhelm von Brincken, German diplomat and spy during World War I (b. 1881)
- January 21 – Harry Bateman, British-American mathematician (b. 1882)
- January 23
  - Matteo Bartoli, Italian linguist (b. 1873)
  - Helene Schjerfbeck, Finnish painter (b. 1862)
- January 24 – Morris Alexander, South African politician (b. 1877)
- January 25 – Orishatukeh Faduma, American missionary (b. 1855)
- January 26 – Katharine Bushnell, doctor, Christian writer, Bible scholar, social activist and a pioneer of feminist theology (b. 1855)
- January 29
  - Hideo Hatoyama, Japanese jurist (b. 1884)
  - Harry Hopkins, American politician (b. 1890)
  - Adriaan van Maanen, Dutch–born American astronomer (b. 1884)
- January 31
  - Pietro Boetto, Italian Roman Catholic cardinal and eminence (b. 1871)
  - Luis Orgaz Yoldi, Spanish general (b. 1881)
  - Franz Ritter von Epp, German general and politician (b. 1868)

=== February ===
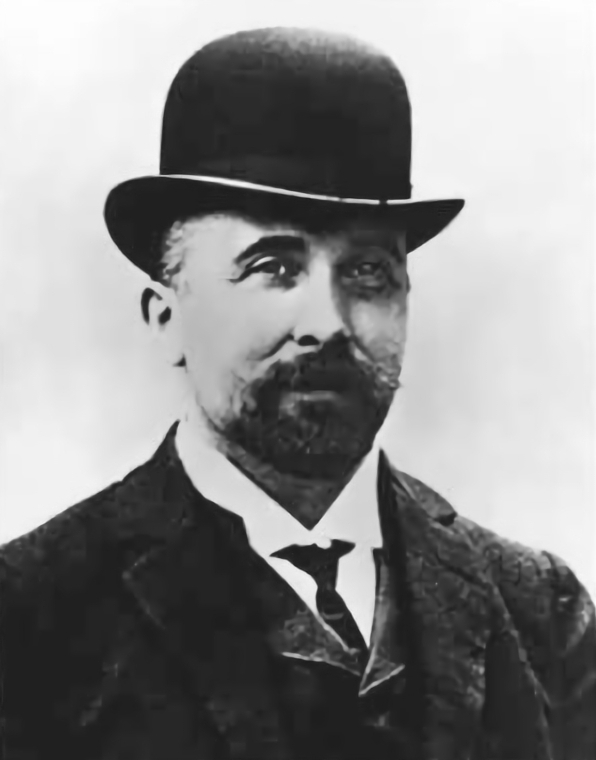
Felix Hoffmann

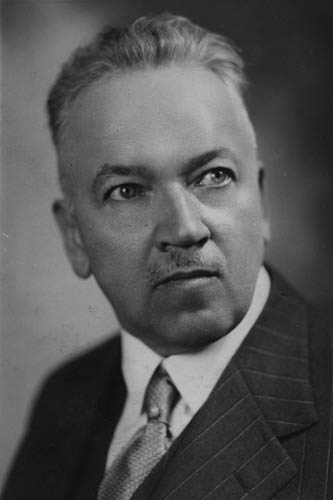
Rafael Erich

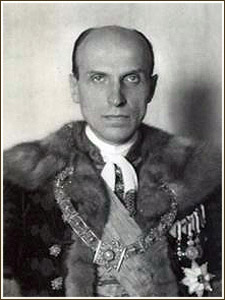
Béla Imrédy

- February 2 – Rondo Hatton, American actor (b. 1894)
- February 3
  - Friedrich Jeckeln, German SS officer and mass murderer (executed) (b. 1895)
  - Wang Lianshou, wet nurse to Puyi (b. 1887)
- February 4 – Herbert Baker, English architect (b. 1862)
- February 5 – George Arliss, British actor (b. 1868)
- February 6
  - Upendranath Brahmachari, Indian scientist (b. 1873)
  - Oswald Kabasta, Austrian conductor (suicide) (b. 1896)
  - Justus D. Barnes, American actor (b. 1862)
- February 8
  - Felix Hoffmann, German chemist (b. 1868)
  - Miles Mander, British actor (b. 1888)
- February 11 – Ludovic-Oscar Frossard, French socialist, communist politician (b. 1889)
- February 12
  - George Dumas, French doctor, psychologist (b. 1866)
  - Ted Thorn, Royal Air Force pilot, squadron commander and flying ace in WWII (b. 1913)
- February 15
  - Maliq Bushati, Albanian collaborator, 18th Prime Minister of Albania (executed) (b. 1880)
  - Cornelius Johnson, American field athlete (b. 1913)
- February 17
  - Dorothy Gibson, American actress (b. 1889)
  - Benjamin I, Ecumenical Patriarch of Constantinople (b. 1871)
- February 19
  - Rafael Erich, Finnish politician, professor, diplomat and 6th Prime Minister of Finland (b. 1879)
  - Ahmed Hassanein, Egyptian courtier, diplomat, politician and explorer (b. 1889)
- February 21
  - José Streel, Belgian journalist and Nazi collaborator (executed) (b. 1911)
  - Theodore Stark Wilkinson, American admiral (b. 1888)
- February 23 – Tomoyuki Yamashita, Japanese general (executed) (b. 1885)
- February 24
  - Alfred Henke, German politician (b. 1868)
  - Marian Spore Bush, American dentist, painter, and wife of Irving T. Bush (b. 1878)
- February 25 – René Le Grèves, French cyclist (b. 1910)
- February 26 – Jackie, Nubian-born MGM lion (b. 1915)
- February 27 – James Cecil Parke, Irish rugby player, tennis player and golfer (b. 1910)
- February 28
  - Béla Imrédy, Hungarian economist, politician and 32nd Prime Minister of Hungary (executed) (b. 1891)
  - Giuseppe Salvago Raggi, Italian diplomat (b. 1866)

=== March ===
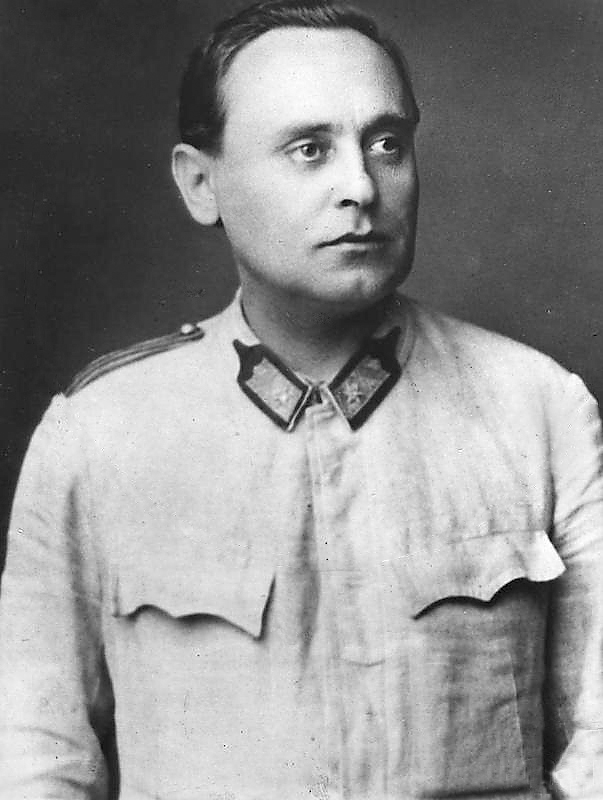
Ferenc Szálasi

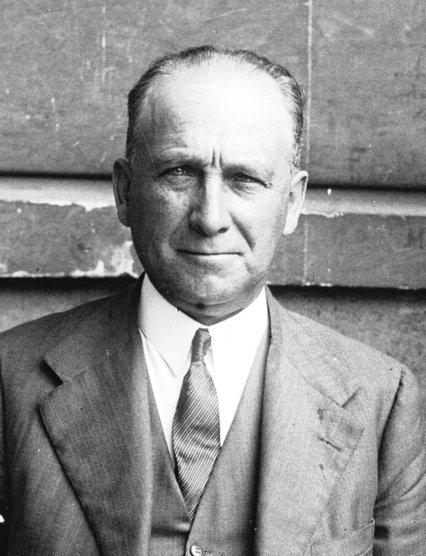
Francisco Largo Caballero

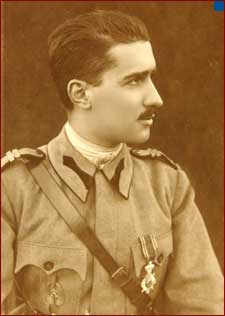
Barbu Știrbey

- March 2
  - John Whittle, Australian recipient of the Victoria Cross (b. 1882)
  - Logan Pearsall Smith, American-born British essayist and critic (b. 1865)
- March 3 – Viktor Axmann, Yugoslav architect (b. 1883)
- March 4
  - Bror von Blixen-Finecke, Swedish big-game hunter (b. 1886)
  - Charles Waldron, American stage and film actor( b. 1874)
  - Martyrs of Albania, Catholics (executed)
    - Mark Çuni, seminarian (b. 1919)
    - Daniel Dajani, Jesuit priest (b. 1906)
    - Giovanni Fausti, Italian Jesuit priest (b. 1899)
    - Gjelosh Lulashi (b. 1925)
    - Qerim Sadiku (b. 1919)
    - Kolë Shllaku, friar (b. 1906)
- March 6 – Antonio Caso Andrade, Mexican philosopher (b. 1878)
- March 8 – Frederick W. Lanchester, English polymath and engineer (b. 1868)
- March 9 – Adolfo Ferrata, Italian pathologist, hematologist (b. 1880)
- March 12
  - Ferenc Szálasi, Hungarian military officer, Fascist politician and 37th Prime Minister of Hungary (executed) (b. 1897)
  - Leonida Tonelli, Italian mathematician (b. 1885)
- March 13 – Werner von Blomberg, German field marshal (b. 1878)
- March 14 – Hubert D. Stephens, American lawyer and politician (b. 1875)
- March 16
  - José Júlio da Costa, Portuguese activist (b. 1893)
  - Alladiya Khan, Indian singer (b. 1855)
- March 17 – Joseph de Pesquidoux, French writer (b. 1869)
- March 19 – Augusto Nicolás Martínez, Ecuadorian agronomist, economist, geologist, researcher, educator and mountaineer (b. 1860)
- March 20
  - Frederick M. Smith, American religious leader and author (b. 1874)
  - Henry Handel Richardson, Australian author (b. 1870)
- March 21 – Howard L. Vickery, U.S. naval officer (b. 1892)
- March 22
  - Clemens August Graf von Galen, German Catholic Cardinal, Bishop of Münster (b. 1878)
  - David L. Brainard, career officer in the United States Army and arctic explorer (b. 1856)
- March 23
  - Francisco Largo Caballero, Spanish politician, trade unionist and 66th Prime Minister of Spain (b. 1869)
  - Gilbert N. Lewis, American chemist (b. 1875)
- March 24
  - Alexander Alekhine, Russian chess player (b. 1892)
  - Carl Schuhmann, German athlete (b. 1869)
  - Barbu Știrbey, 30th Prime Minister of Romania (b. 1872)
- March 26 – Ezequiel Fernández, acting President of Panama (b. 1886)
- March 29
  - László Baky, Hungarian Nazi leader (executed) (b. 1898)
  - George Washington, Belgian inventor and businessman (b. 1871)
- March 31 – John Vereker, 6th Viscount Gort, British field marshal (b. 1886)

=== April ===
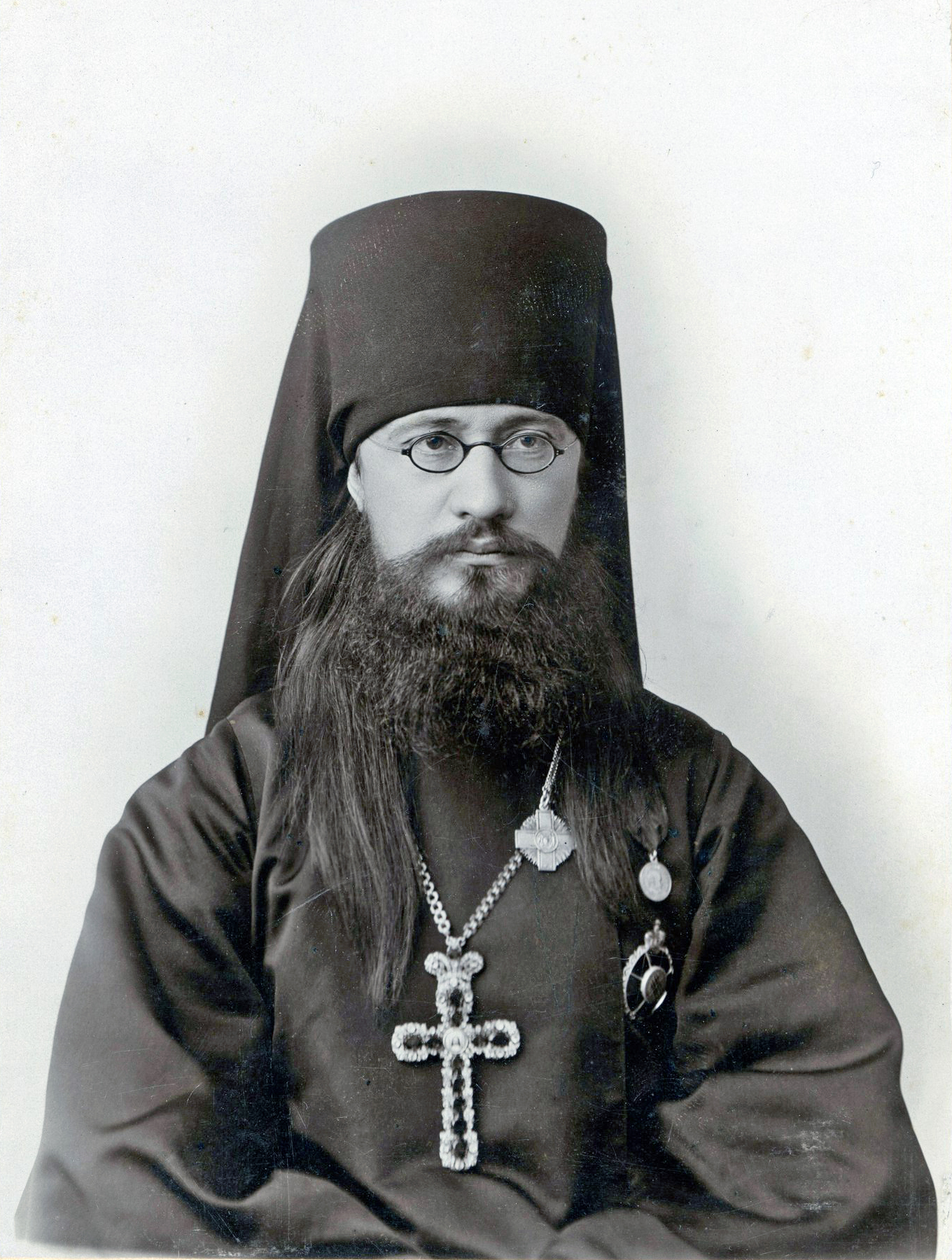
Patriarch Eulogius

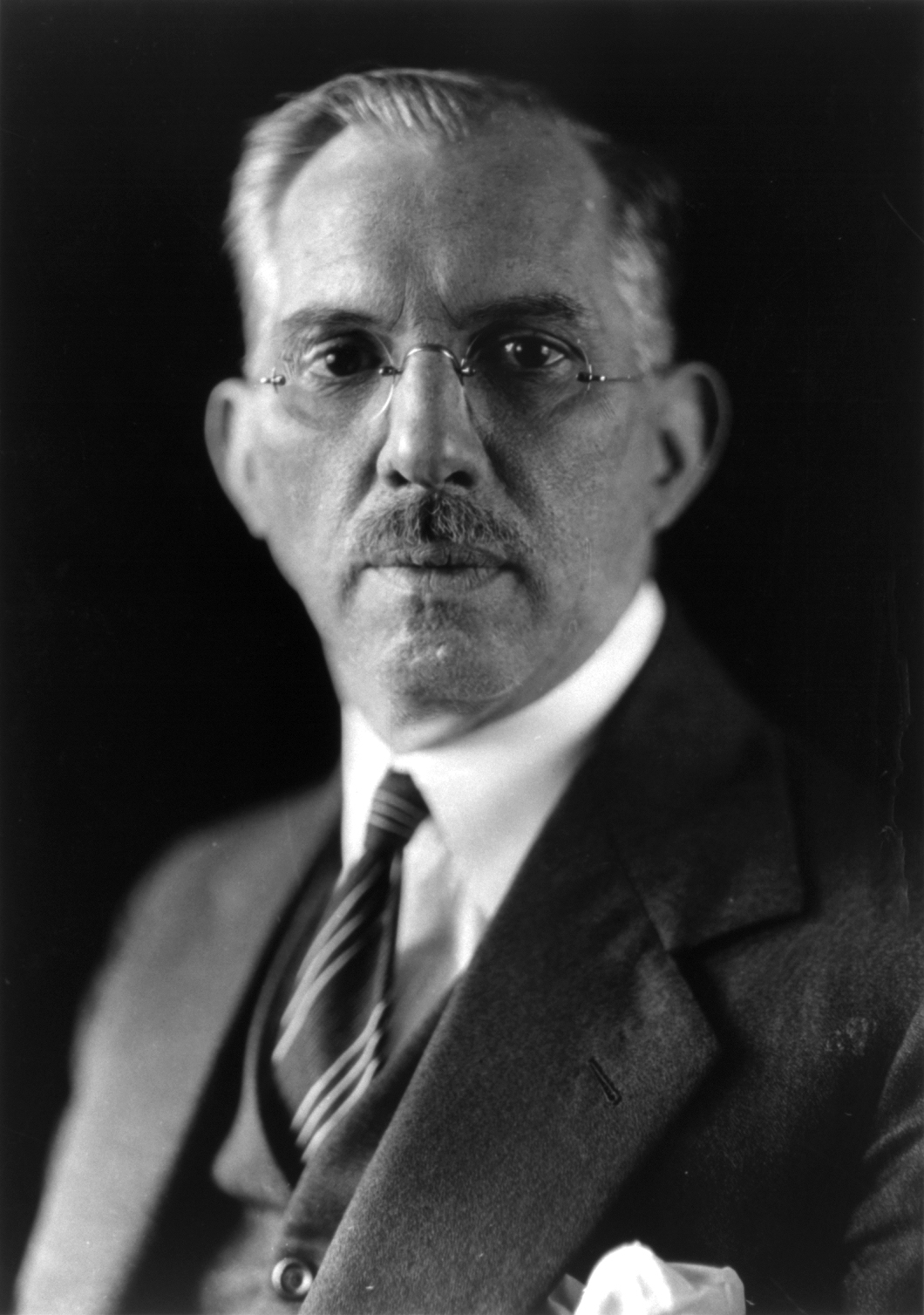
Juan Bautista Sacasa

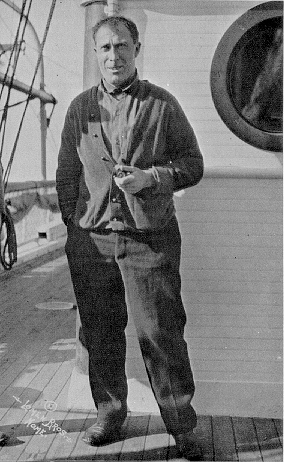
Robert Bartlett

- April 1
  - Noah Beery, American actor (b. 1882)
  - Edward Sheldon, American playwright (b. 1886)
- April 2 – Kate Bruce, American silent screen actress (b. 1858)
- April 3
  - Alf Common, English footballer (b. 1880)
  - Masaharu Homma, Japanese general (executed) (b. 1887)
- April 4 – Hans Bothmann, last commandant of the Chełmno extermination camp (suicide) (b. 1911)
- April 5
  - Ion Boițeanu, Romanian general (b. 1885)
  - Vincent Youmans, American composer (b. 1898)
- April 6
  - Chief Thunderbird, Native American actor (b. 1866)
  - James Young Deer, Native American film producer (b. 1876)
- April 7 – Padmanath Gohain Baruah, Indian novelist, poet and dramatist (b. 1871)
- April 8
  - Bo Gu, 3rd General Secretary of the Chinese Communist Party (accident) (b. 1907)
  - Patriarch Eulogius (b. 1868)
  - Ye Ting, Chinese military leader (b. 1896)
- April 11
  - Andor Jaross, ethnic Hungarian politician (executed) (b. 1896)
  - Dem. Theodorescu, Romanian journalist, humorist and critic (b. 1888)
- April 12 – Marian Zyndram-Kościałkowski, Polish politician, freemason and military officer (b. 1892)
- April 13
  - William Henry Bell, English-born South African composer, conductor and lecturer (b. 1873)
  - Ernest Browne, Irish tennis player (b. 1855)
- April 14 – Otto Dowling, United States Navy captain, 25th Governor of American Samoa (b. 1881)
- April 15
  - Infanta Adelgundes, Duchess of Guimarães (b. 1858)
  - C. W. A. Scott, English aviator (b. 1903)
- April 17
  - Guido Calza, Italian archaeologist (b. 1888)
  - Juan Bautista Sacasa, 20th President of Nicaragua (b. 1874)
  - Agnes Weinrich, American visual artist (b. 1873)
  - V. S. Srinivasa Sastri, Indian politician, administrator, educator, orator and Indian independence activist (b. 1869)
- April 19 – Harold Stiles, English surgeon (b. 1863)
- April 20
  - Mae Busch, American actress (b. 1891)
  - Egerton Reuben Stedman, Canadian politician (b. 1872)
- April 21 – John Maynard Keynes, British economist (b. 1883)
- April 22
  - Lionel Atwill, British actor (b. 1885)
  - Harlan F. Stone, Chief Justice of the United States (b. 1872)
- April 23 – T. Tileston Wells, American attorney and the Romanian Consul General (b. 1865)
- April 26
  - James Larkin White, American cowboy, guano miner, park ranger and discoverer of Carlsbad Caverns (b. 1882)
  - Antero Svensson, Finnish major general, member of the Jäger Movement and recipient of the Mannerheim Cross (b. 1892)
- April 27
  - George E. White, American Congregationalist missionary and witness to the Armenian genocide (b. 1861)
  - Franz Anton Basch, Shwovish Nazi politician in Hungary (executed) (b. 1901)
- April 28
  - Robert Bartlett, American explorer and navigator (b. 1875)
  - Louis Bachelier, French mathematician (b. 1870)
- April 30 – Sava Athanasiu, Romanian geologist and paleontologist (b. 1861)

=== May ===
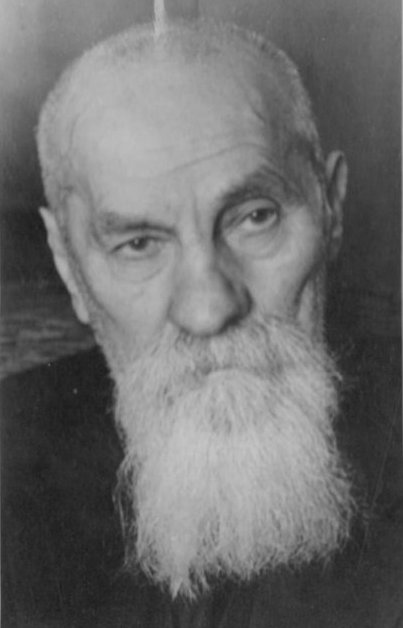
Alexei Nikolaevich Bach

Friedrich, Prince of Waldeck and Pyrmont

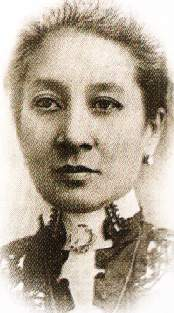
Marcela de Agoncillo

- May 1
  - Bill Johnston, American tennis champion (b. 1894)
  - Israfil Mammadov, Soviet WWII heroine (b. 1919)
- May 3 – Charles Daniel-Vincent, French teacher and politician (b. 1874)
- May 9
  - Léon Guillet, French metallurgist (b. 1873)
  - Connie Gilchrist, Countess of Orkney, British child artist's model, actress, dancer and singer (b. 1865)
- May 10 – Emile de Cartier de Marchienne, Belgian diplomat (b. 1871)
- May 11 – Pedro Henríquez Ureña, Dominican essayist, philosopher, humanist and philologist (b. 1884)
- May 13 – Alexei Nikolaevich Bach, Soviet biochemist, revolutionary leader (b. 1857)
- May 16
  - Bruno Tesch, German chemist, Nazi war criminal (executed) (b. 1890)
  - Karl Weinbacher, German manager, war criminal (executed) (b. 1898)
  - Karl Eberhard Schöngarth, Nazi SS officer and war criminal (executed) (b. 1903)
- May 17 – William Jefferson Blythe Jr., American salesman and biological father of Bill Clinton (b. 1918)
- May 19
  - Francesco Camero Medici, Italian diplomat (b. 1886)
  - Ángel Ossorio y Gallardo, Spanish lawyer, statesman (b. 1873)
  - Booth Tarkington, American novelist (b. 1869)
  - John K. Tener, Irish-born American politician and Major League Baseball player and executive (b. 1863)
- May 20
  - Jacob Ellehammer, Danish inventor (b. 1871)
  - Enrico Gasparri, Italian Roman Catholic cardinal, archbishop (b. 1871)
- May 22 – Karl Hermann Frank, German Nazi official, war criminal (executed) (b. 1898)
- May 25 – Ernest Rhys, Welsh-English writer (b. 1859)
- May 26
  - Friedrich, Prince of Waldeck and Pyrmont (b. 1865)
  - Joseffy, Austrian magician (b. 1873)
  - Francis Lacey, English cricketer, cricket administrator and barrister (b. 1859)
- May 27
  - Claire Croiza, French soprano (b. 1882)
  - Henri Hauser, French historian, geographer and economist (b. 1866)
- May 28
  - Claus Schilling, German medical researcher and war criminal (executed) (b. 1871)
  - Otto Moll, Nazi mass murderer and war criminal (executed) (b. 1915)
  - Wilhelm Ruppert, SS-TV Obersturmbannführer in charge of executions at Dachau concentration camp (executed) (b. 1905)
  - Carter Glass, American newspaper publisher and politician (b. 1858)
- May 29
  - `Cagnaccio di San Pietro, Italian painter (b. 1897)
  - Martin Gottfried Weiss, commandant of the Dachau concentration camp and Nazi war criminal (executed) (b. 1905)
- May 30
  - Marcela Agoncillo, Filipino who sewed the first Filipino flag (b. 1860)
  - Louis Slotin, Canadian physicist, chemist (b. 1910)
- May 31 – Picoğlu Osman, Turkish kemenche player (b. 1901)

=== June ===
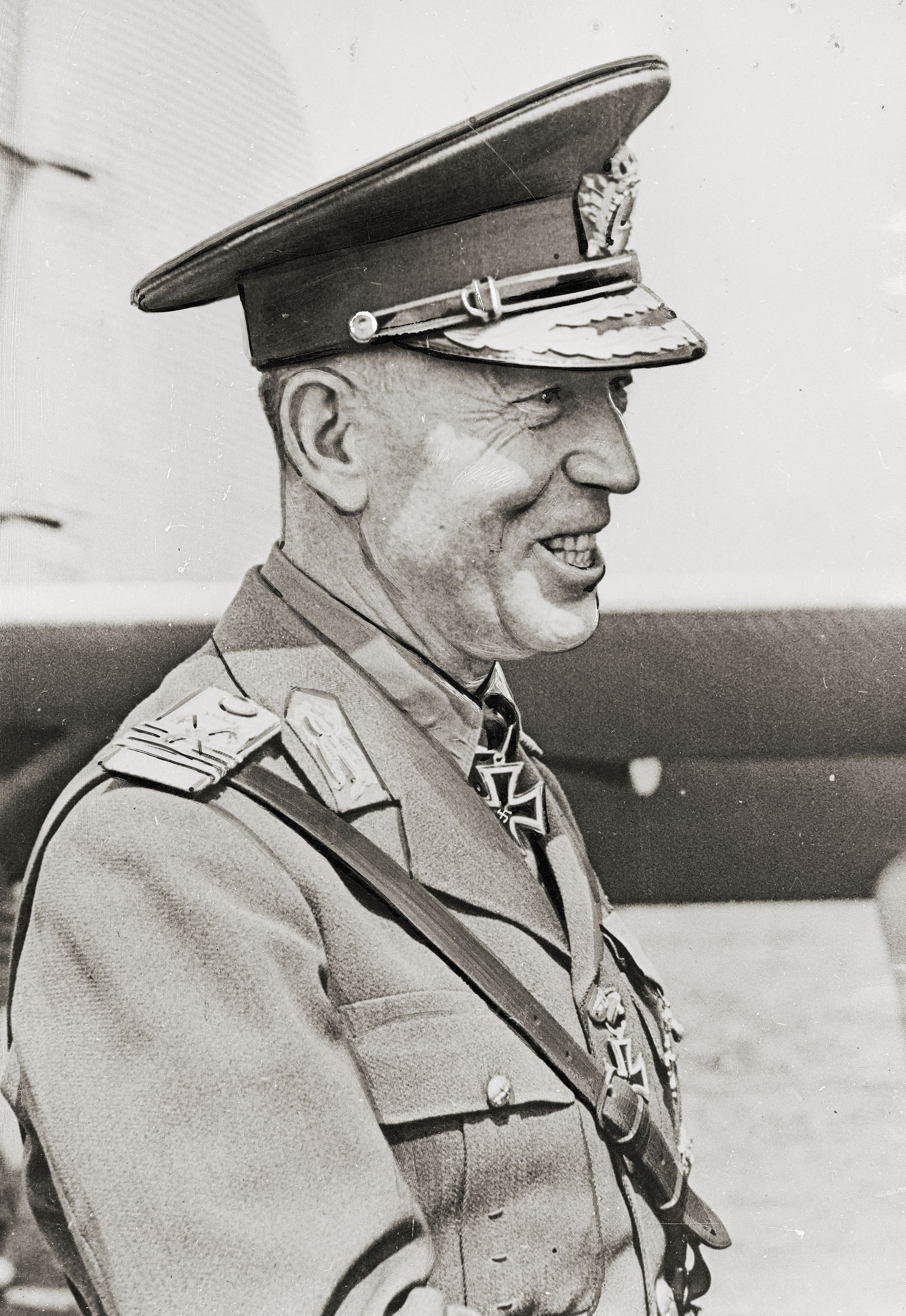
Ion Antonescu

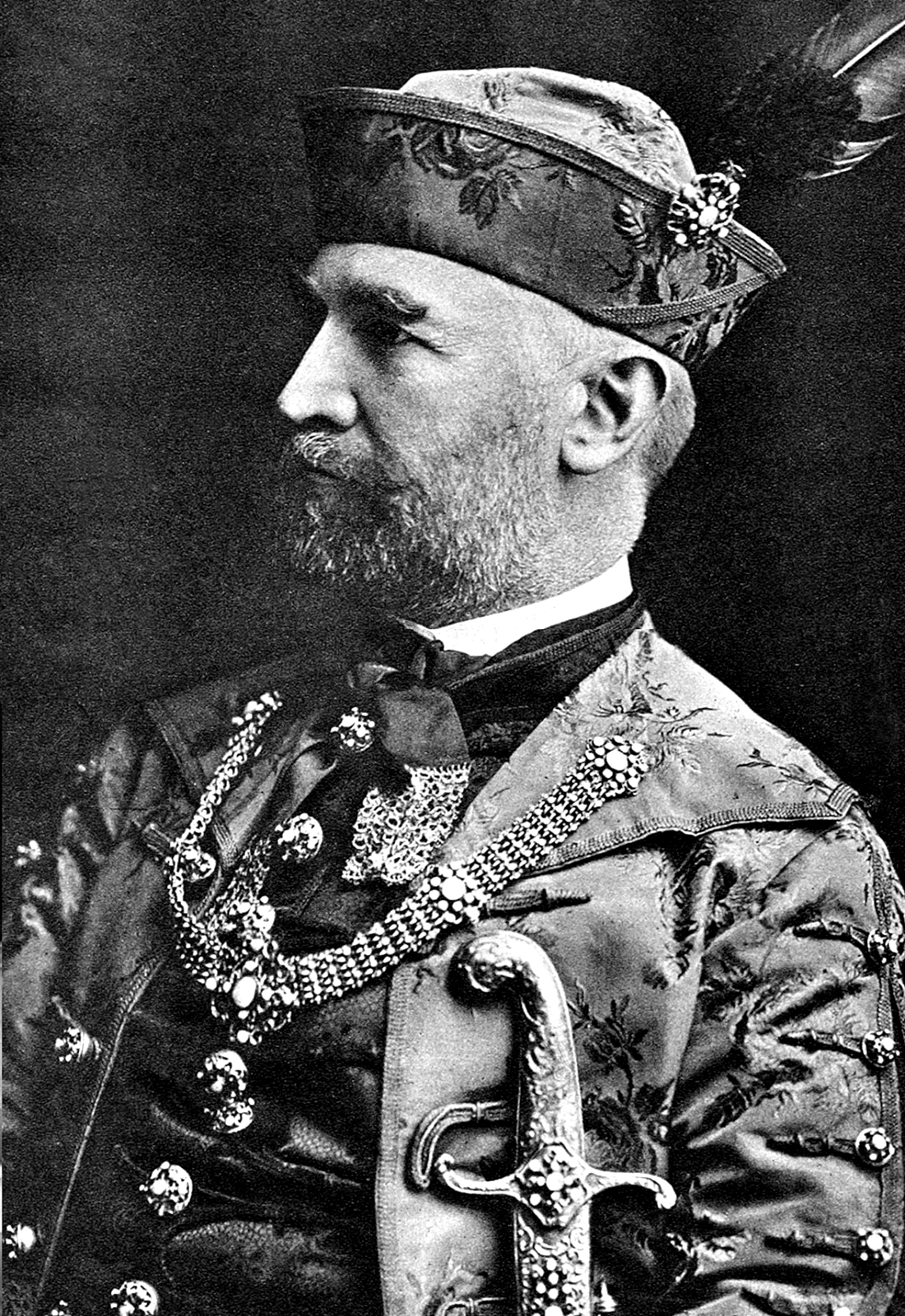
Sándor Simonyi-Semadam

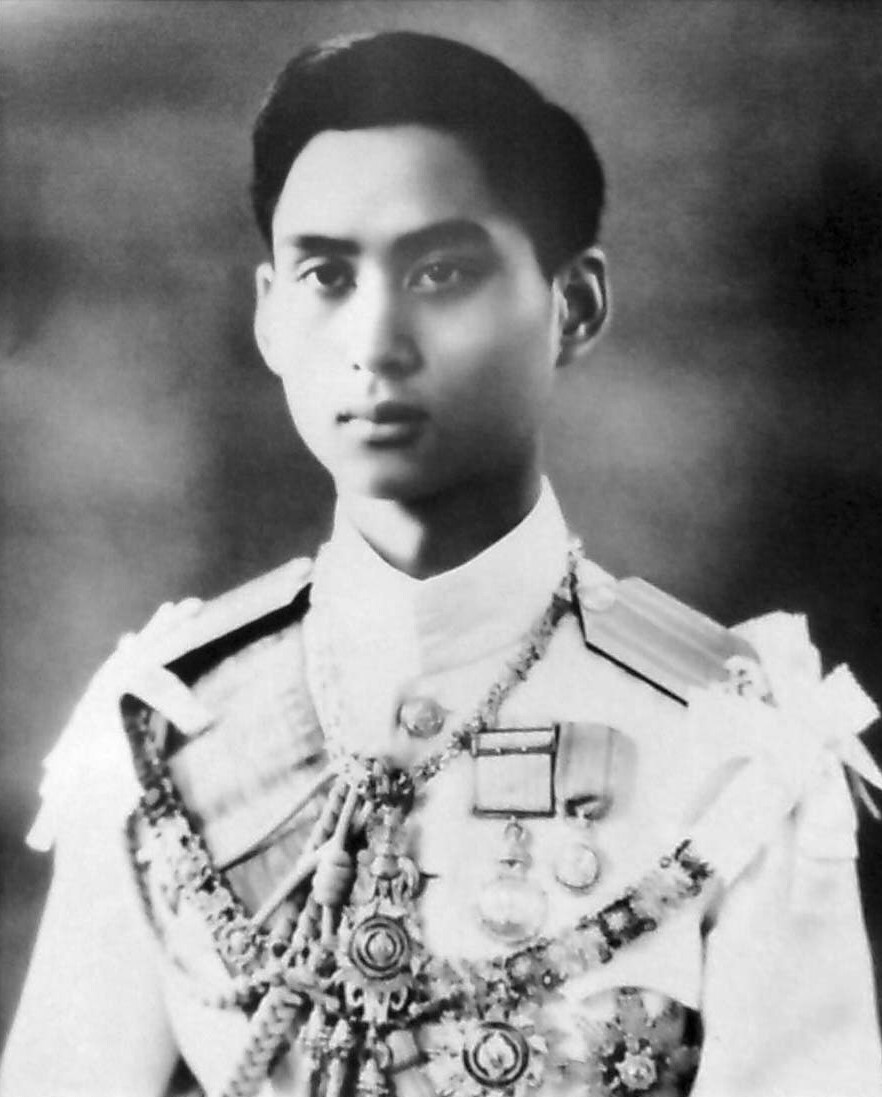
King Ananda Mahidol (Rama VIII) of Thailand

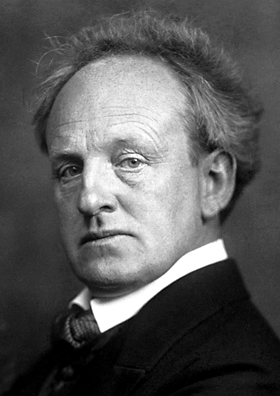
Gerhart Hauptmann

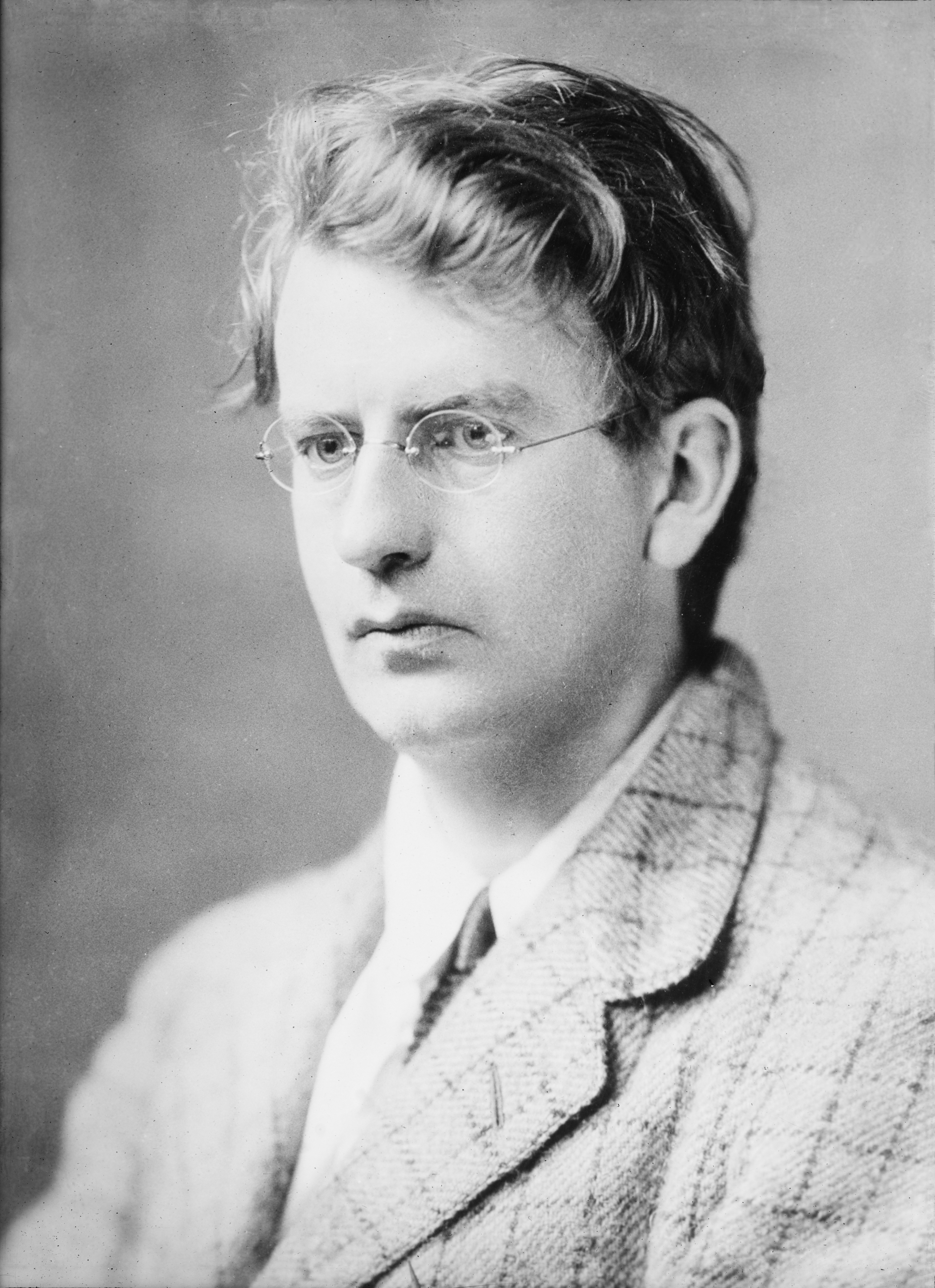
John Logie Baird

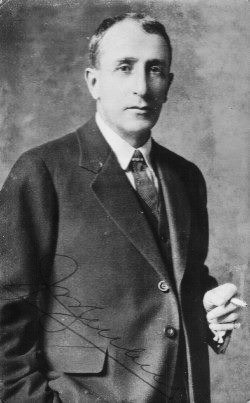
Jorge Ubico

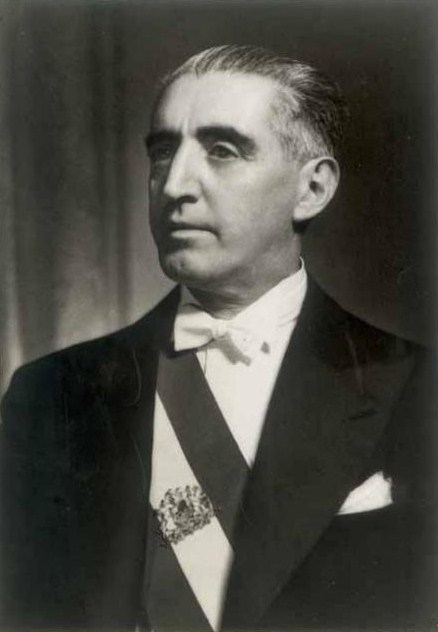
Juan Antonio Ríos

- June 1
  - Ion Antonescu, Romanian soldier, politician, 43rd Prime Minister of Romania and Romanian dictator (executed) (b. 1882)
  - Leo Slezak, German tenor (b. 1873)
  - Mihai Antonescu, Romanian politician and war criminal (executed) (b. 1904)
- June 3 – Mikhail Kalinin, 1st Head of State/President of the Soviet Union (b. 1875)
- June 4 – Sándor Simonyi-Semadam, Hungarian politician, 26th Prime Minister of Hungary (b. 1864)
- June 5 – Maud Watson, British tennis player, first female Wimbledon champion (b. 1864)
- June 6
  - Isidro Ancheta, Filipino painter (b. 1882)
  - Gerhart Hauptmann, German writer, Nobel Prize laureate (b. 1862)
- June 8 – John L. Bates, American politician (b. 1859)
- June 9 – Ananda Mahidol (Rama VIII), King of Thailand (assassinated) (b. 1925)
- June 10
  - Jack Johnson, American boxer (b. 1878)
  - Carruthers Beattie, first principal and Vice Chancellor of the University of Cape Town (b. 1866)
- June 11
  - Juanita Breckenridge Bates, American minister (b. 1860)
  - Frank Swettenham, British colonial administrator and first Resident general of the Federated Malay States (b. 1850)
- June 12
  - Hisaichi Terauchi, Marshal of the Imperial Japanese Army (b. 1879)
  - John H. Bankhead II, American politician (b. 1872)
- June 13
  - Major Bowes, American radio personality (b. 1874)
  - Charles Butterworth, American actor (b. 1896)
- June 14
  - Jorge Ubico, Guatemalan army general, 21st President of Guatemala (b. 1878)
  - John Logie Baird, British television pioneer (b. 1888)
- June 15
  - João Batista Becker, German-born Brazilian Roman Catholic prelate, archbishop (b. 1870)
  - Jovita Idar, Mexican-American journalist and political activist (b. 1885)
- June 16 – Ludwig Winder, Austrian-Czech German-language writer, journalist and literary critic (b. 1889)
- June 18 – Eugen Hirschfield, Australian practitioner (b. 1866)
- June 19
  - Theodor Wulf, German physicist, Jesuit priest (b. 1868)
  - Beatrice Chanler, American actress (b. 1880)
- June 20 – Wanrong, last empress of China (b. 1906)
- June 23 – William S. Hart, American stage actor, silent film Western star, film director and writer (b. 1864)
- June 24 – Marian Bernaciak, Polish World War II heroine (b. 1917)
- June 26 – Alma Bridwell White, founder and a bishop of the Pillar of Fire Church (b. 1862)
- June 27
  - Juan Antonio Ríos, Chilean political figure, 24th President of Chile and World War II leader (b. 1888)
  - Wanda Gág, American artist, author, translator and illustrator (b. 1893)
- June 28 – Antoinette Perry, American actress, director (b. 1888)
- June 29 – Miroslav Filipović, Bosnian-Croatian Franciscan friar, Ustashe military chaplain and war criminal (executed) (b. 1915)
- June 30 – Jelica Belović-Bernardzikowska, Yugoslav journalist, writer and journalist (b. 1870)

=== July ===
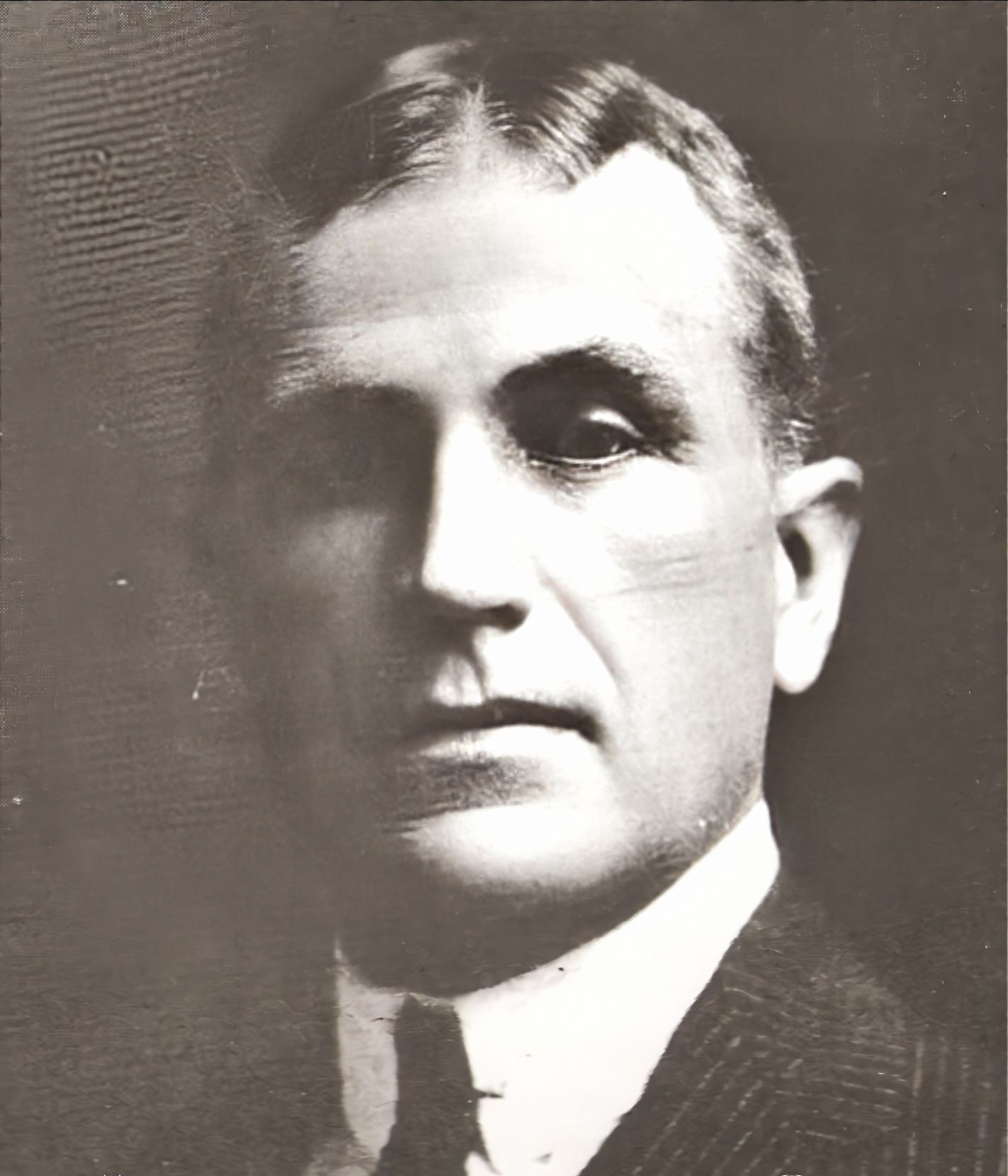
Federico Laredo Bru

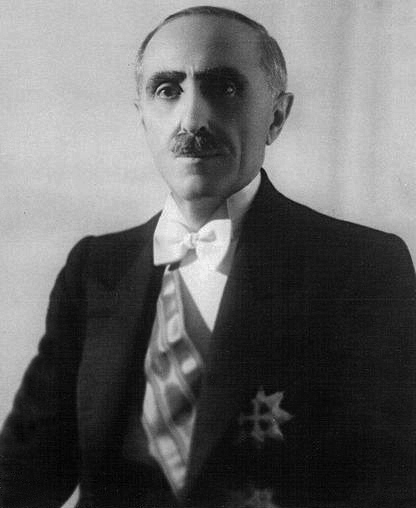
Shefqet Verlaci

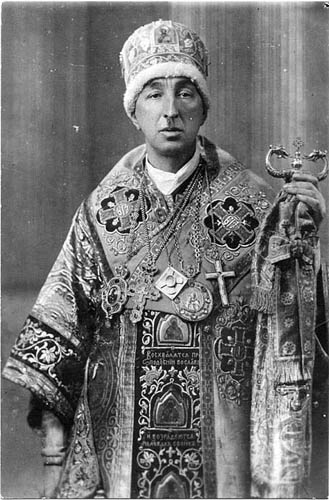
Blessed Alexander Vvedensky

- July 1 – Augustyn Józef Czartoryski, Polish nobleman (b. 1907)
- July 2
  - Mary Alden, American stage and screen actress (b. 1883)
  - Albert Sechehaye, Swiss linguist (b. 1870)
- July 3 – Edoardo Bianchi, Italian entrepreneur, inventor (b. 1865)
- July 4
  - Jenny-Wanda Barkmann, German Nazi overseer at Stutthof concentration camp (executed) (b. 1922)
  - Elisabeth Becker, German Nazi overseer at Stutthof concentration camp (executed) (b. 1923)
  - Wanda Klaff, German Nazi overseer at Stutthof concentration camp (executed) (b. 1922)
  - Ewa Paradies, German Nazi overseer at Stutthof concentration camp (executed) (b. 1920)
  - Gerda Steinhoff, German Nazi overseer at Stutthof concentration camp (executed) (b. 1922)
  - Othenio Abel, Austrian paleontologist and evolutionary biologist (b. 1875)
- July 7 – Federico Laredo Brú, 8th President of Cuba (b. 1875)
- July 8
  - Orrick Glenday Johns, American writer (b. 1887)
  - Laura, Lady Troubridge, British novelist and etiquette writer (b. 1867)
- July 10 – Sidney Hillman, American labor leader (b. 1887)
- July 12
  - Ray Stannard Baker, American journalist, author (b. 1870)
  - Teresa Janina Kierocińska, Polish Discalced Carmelite nun and venerable (b. 1885)
- July 13 – Alfred Stieglitz, American photographer (b. 1864)
- July 15 – Benjamin W. Alpiner, American businessman and politician (b. 1867)
- July 16 – Raffaele Conflenti, Italian engineer, aircraft designer (b. 1889)
- July 17
  - Consolata Betrone, Italian Franciscan mystic and servant of God (b. 1903)
  - Florence Fuller, South African-born Australian artist (b. 1867)
  - Kosta Mušicki, Yugoslav general (executed) (b. 1897)
  - Sir Campbell Tait, admiral and Governor of Southern Rhodesia (b. 1886)
  - Draža Mihailović, Yugoslav Serb general in WWIII and leader of Chetniks (executed) (b. 1893)
- July 18
  - Ehrhard Schmidt, German admiral (b. 1863)
  - Alfons Tracki, Albanian priest (executed) (b. 1896)
  - Wilfred Buckland, American art director (b. 1866)
- July 19 – George Mackenzie Brown, Canadian-born British publisher (b. 1869)
- July 20 – Shiro Kawase, Japanese admiral (b. 1889)
- July 21
  - Shefqet Vërlaci, Albanian politician, 12th Prime Minister of Albania (b. 1877)
  - Gualberto Villarroel, 39th President of Bolivia (lynched) (b. 1908)
  - Arthur Greiser, German general and war criminal (executed) (b. 1897)
- July 22 – Edward Sperling, Russian-American-Jewish writer, Zionist (assassinated) (b. 1889)
- July 23 – James Maxton, British pacifist, politician and leader of the Independent Labour Party (b.1885)
- July 26 – Alexander Vvedensky, Soviet Orthodox religious leader and blessed (b. 1889)
- July 25
  - Harry Davis, Canadian gangster (b. 1898)
  - Tao Xingzhi, Chinese educator and reformer (b. 1891)
- July 27
  - Franz Anton Basch, German politician and war criminal (executed) (b. 1901)
  - Gertrude Stein, American writer (b. 1874)
- July 28
  - Alphonsa of the Immaculate Conception, Indian Syro-Malabar Catholic and Eastern Catholic religious sister and saint (b. 1910)
  - Emily Thorn Vanderbilt, American philanthropist and a member of the Vanderbilt family (b. 1852)
- July 31
  - Solomon Dias Bandaranaike, Ceylonese politician, Governor-General of Ceylon (b. 1862)
  - Katherine Mary Clutterbuck, Australian Anglican nun who looked after orphaned children (b. 1860)

=== August ===
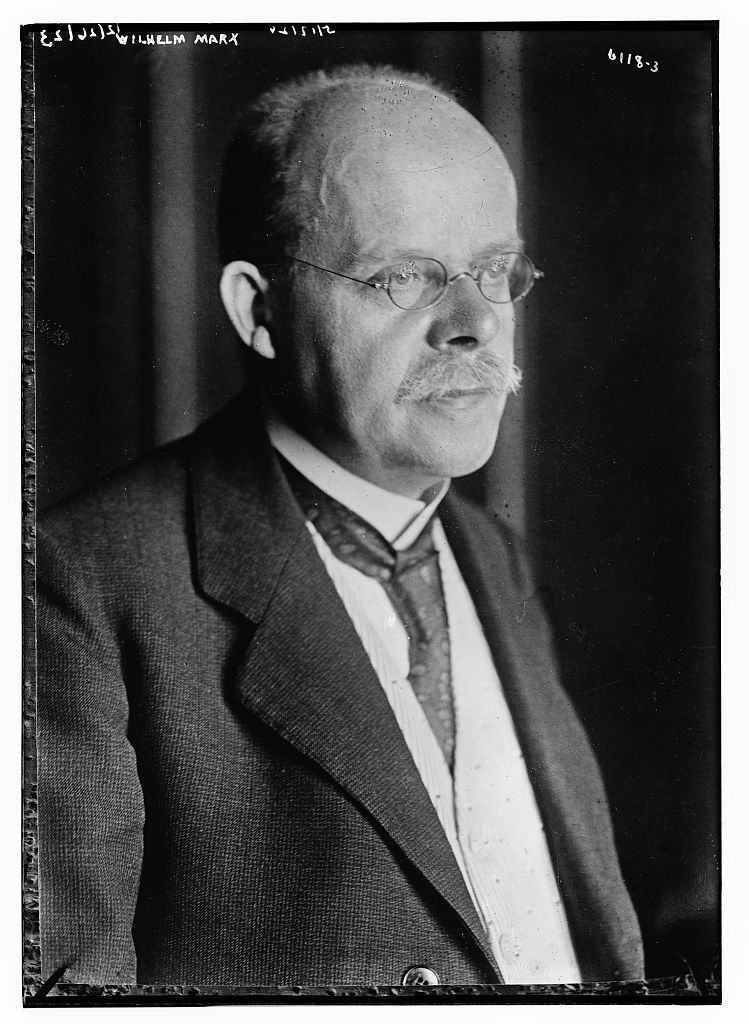
Wilhelm Marx

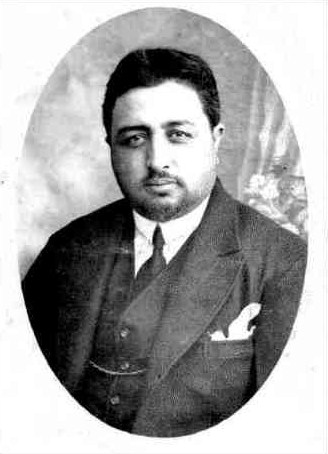
King Inayatullah Khan

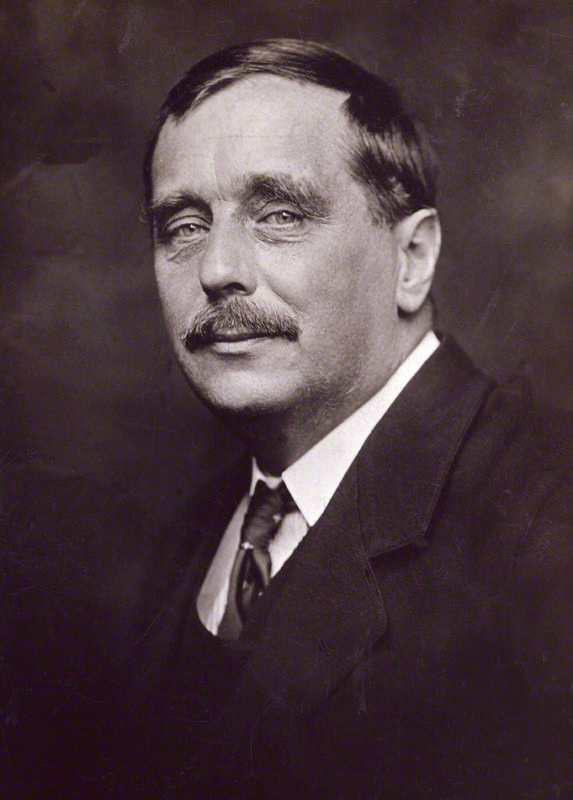
H. G. Wells

- August 1
  - Andrey Vlasov, Soviet general, commander of the Russian Liberation Army (executed) (b. 1901)
  - Sergei Bunyachenko, Soviet Red Army defector (executed) (b. 1902)
  - Fyodor Truhin, Soviet major general and defector during WWII (executed) (b. 1896)
- August 2 – Karl, Prince of Leiningen, German prince (b. 1898)
- August 5
  - Otto Franke, German sinologist (b. 1863)
  - Wilhelm Marx, German lawyer, politician and 17th Chancellor of Germany (b. 1863)
- August 6
  - Blanche Bingley, English tennis champion (b. 1863)
  - Tony Lazzeri, American baseball player (New York Yankees), MLB Hall of Famer (b. 1903)
- August 8
  - Maria Barrientos, Spanish opera singer (b. 1884)
  - Vulcana, Welsh strongwoman (b. 1874)
- August 9 – Bert Vogler, South African cricketer (b. 1876)
- August 10 – Léon Gaumont, French film pioneer (b. 1864)
- August 11 – Giuseppe Pietri, Italian composer (b. 1886)
- August 12
  - Inayatullah Khan, King of Afghanistan (b. 1888)
  - Alfred Stock, German chemist (b. 1876)
  - Egon Brecher, Austria-Hungary-born actor and director (b. 1880)
- August 13
  - H. G. Wells, British science fiction writer, historian (The Time Machine) (b. 1866)
  - Émile Berlia, French politician (b. 1878)
- August 14 – Robert Heinrich Wagner, Nazi Party official and politician (executed) (b. 1895)
- August 16 – Prince Fushimi Hiroyasu, Japanese admiral (b. 1875)
- August 17 – Channing Pollock, American playwright (b. 1880)
- August 18
  - Che Yaoxian, Chinese communist (executed) (b. 1894)
  - Luo Shiwen, Chinese communist (executed) (b. 1904)
- August 19 – Jules-Albert de Dion, French automobile pioneer (b. 1856)
- August 20
  - "Rags" Ragland, American comedian, actor (b. 1905)
  - Vojtech Tuka, Slovak politician and WWII war criminal (executed) (b. 1880)
  - Fielding H. Yost, American college football player, coach and athletics administrator (b. 1871)
- August 22 – Döme Sztójay, 35th Prime Minister of Hungary (executed) (b. 1883)
- August 23 – Prince Fulco Ruffo di Calabria, Italian World War I flying ace and senator (b. 1884)
- August 24 – James Clark McReynolds, American jurist (b. 1862)
- August 26 – Jeanie MacPherson, American actress (b. 1887)
- August 28
  - Georgios Kafantaris, Prime Minister of Greece (b. 1873)
  - Rudolph Lambart, 10th Earl of Cavan, British field marshal (b. 1865)
  - Florence Turner, American actress (b. 1885)
- August 29 – John Steuart Curry, American painter (b. 1897)
- August 31 – Harley Granville-Barker, English actor, director, playwright, manager, critic and theorist (b. 1877)

=== September ===
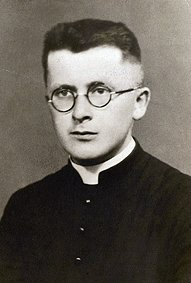
Blessed Francesco Bonifacio

- September 2 – George Robson, American racing driver (b. 1909)
- September 3 – Paul Lincke, German composer (b. 1866)
- September 4 – Nobu Shirase, Japanese army officer and Antarctic explorer (b. 1861)
- September 10 – Olivér Halassy, Hungarian water polo player and freestyle swimmer (killed by Soviet soldier) (b. 1909)
- September 11 – Francesco Bonifacio, Italian Roman Catholic priest and blessed (killed in action) (b. 1912)
- September 13
  - William Watt, Australian politician, Premier of Victoria (b. 1871)
  - Amon Göth, Austrian Nazi military officer and war criminal (executed) (b. 1908)
  - Paul Wurtsmith, United States Army Air Forces general during World War II (b. 1906)
- September 16
  - Henri Gouraud, French general (b. 1867)
  - James Hopwood Jeans, English physicist, astronomer and mathematician (b. 1877)
  - Mamie Smith, American singer (b. 1891)
  - Louis Bonnier, French architect (b. 1856)
- September 18 – Hassan Suhrawardy, Bengali surgeon, military officer in the British Indian Army, politician and public official (b. 1884)
- September 24 – Gustav Globočnik Edler von Vojka, Austro-Hungarian nobleman and field marshal (b. 1859)
- September 25 – Heinrich George, German actor (b. 1893)
- September 28 – Shivaji VII, Maharaja of Kolhapur (b. 1941)
- September 29 – Raimu, French actor (b. 1883)
- September 30 – Takashi Sakai, Japanese general (executed) (b. 1887)

=== October ===
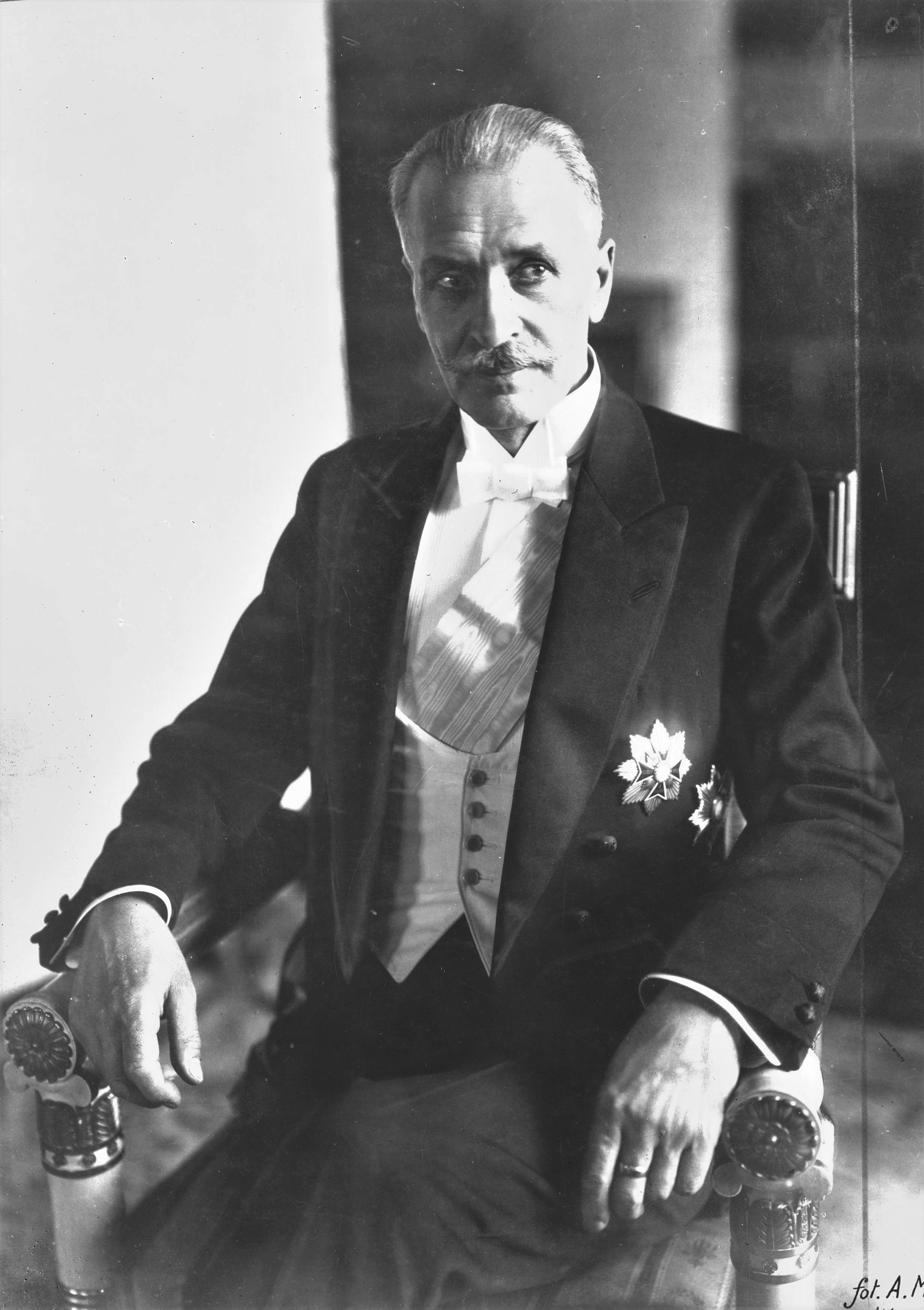
Ignacy Mościcki

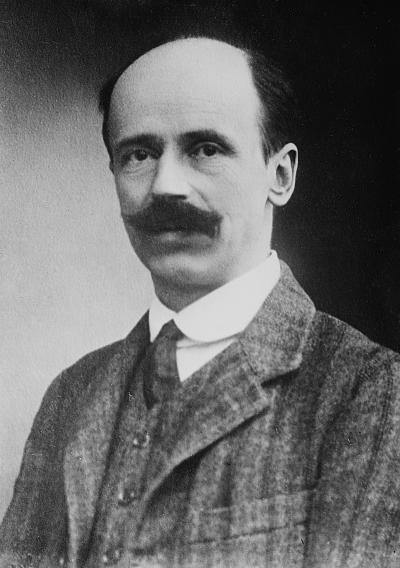
István Bethlen

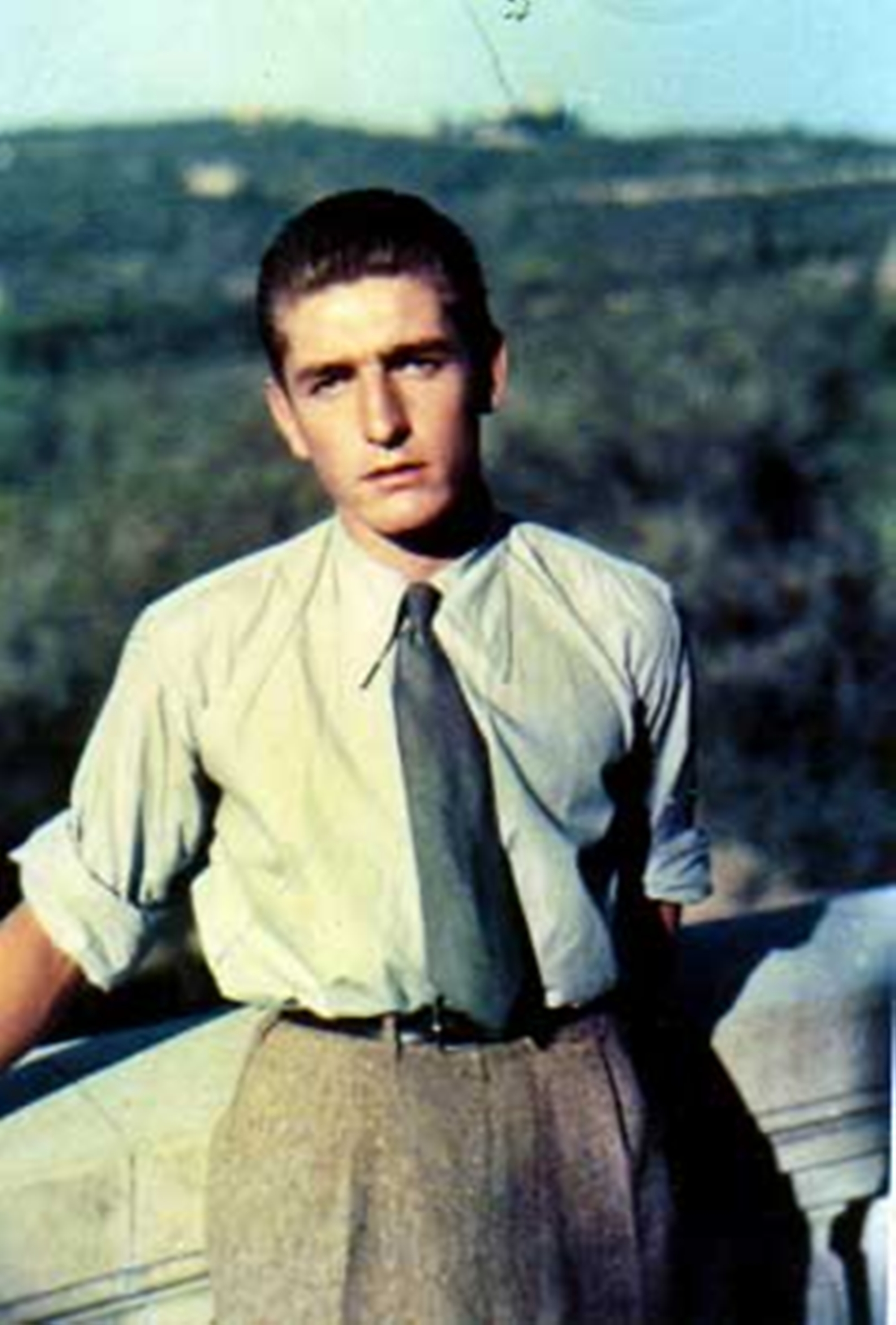
Blessed Alberto Marvelli

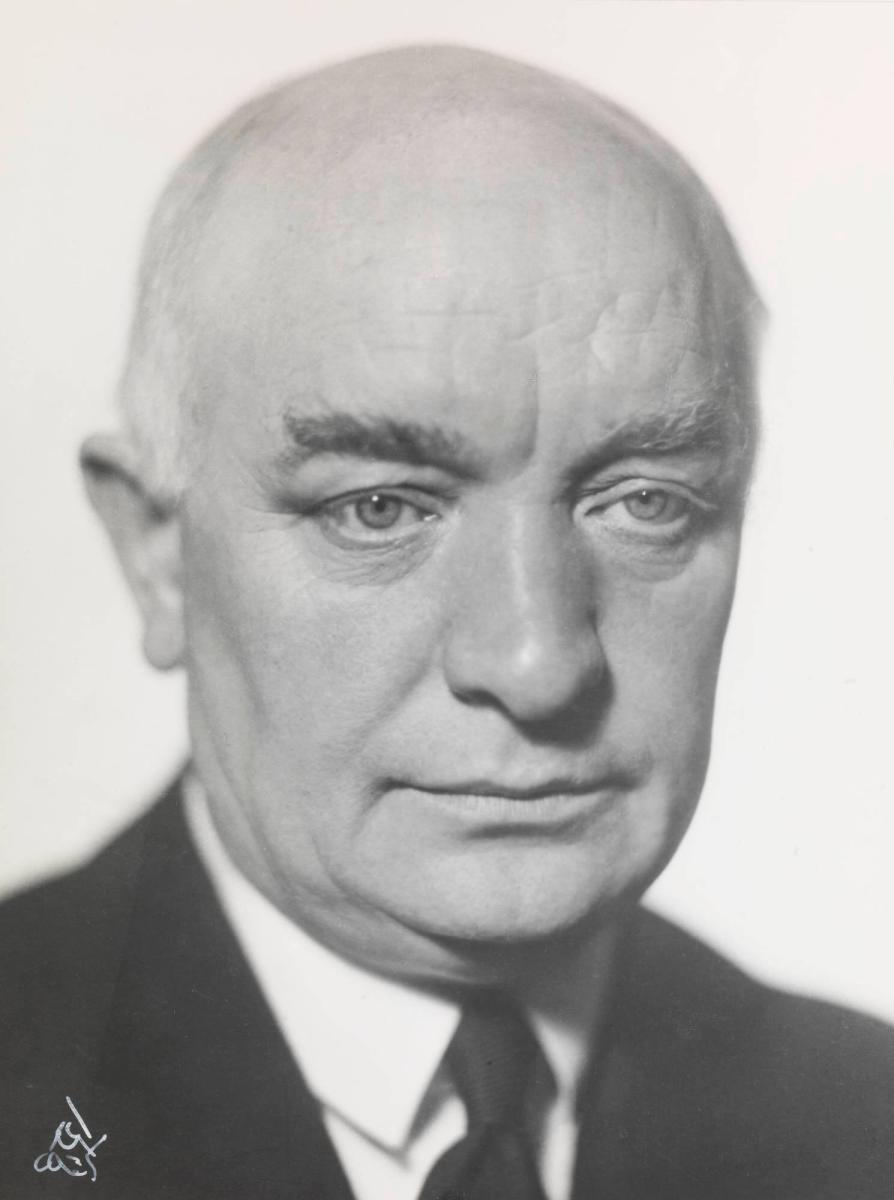
Per Albin Hansson

- October 1
  - Hiroshi Kawabuchi, Japanese politician (b. 1883)
  - Lucy Wheelock, American early childhood education pioneer (b. 1857)
- October 2 – Ignacy Mościcki, Polish chemist, politician and 4th President of Poland (b. 1867)
- October 4 – Barney Oldfield, American race car driver, automobile pioneer (b. 1878)
- October 5
  - István Bethlen, Hungarian aristocrat, statesman and 28th Prime Minister of Hungary (b. 1874)
  - Alberto Marvelli, Italian member of the Roman Catholic action and blessed (b. 1918)
- October 6
  - Per Albin Hansson, Swedish politician, 23rd Prime Minister of Sweden (b. 1885)
  - Joseph Francis Sartori, American banker (b. 1858)
- October 8 – Agustín Parrado y García, Spanish Roman Catholic cardinal (b. 1872)
- October 10 – Prince Vittorio Emanuele, Count of Turin, grandchild of King Victor Emmanuel II and member of the House of Savoy (b. 1870)
- October 12 – Joseph Stilwell, American World War II general (b. 1883)
- October 15 – Hermann Göring, German Nazi Reichsmarschall (suicide) (b. 1893)
- October 16
  - Granville Bantock, British composer (b. 1868)
  - Nuremberg executions
    - Hans Frank, German Nazi Governor General of Poland (b. 1900)
    - Wilhelm Frick, German Nazi Minister of the Interior (b. 1877)
    - Alfred Jodl, German general, World War II Chief of the German armed forces (b. 1890)
    - Ernst Kaltenbrunner, German Nazi police general (b. 1903)
    - Wilhelm Keitel, German field marshal (b. 1882)
    - Joachim von Ribbentrop, German Nazi foreign minister (b. 1893)
    - Alfred Rosenberg, German Nazi ideologist (b. 1893)
    - Fritz Sauckel, German Nazi general plenipotentiary (b. 1894)
    - Arthur Seyss-Inquart, Austrian Nazi leader (b. 1892)
    - Julius Streicher, German Nazi propaganda publisher (b. 1885)
- October 17
  - Russell R. Waesche, US Coast Guard admiral (b. 1886)
  - Frédéric Boissonnas, Swiss photographer (b. 1858)
- October 18 – William H. Strayer, American attorney and politician (b. 1866)
- October 20
  - Igor Demidov, Soviet politician (b. 1873)
  - Karl-Gustav Sauberzweig, Nazi Army Oberst (Colonel) transferred to Waffen-SS in WWII (suicide) (b. 1899)
- October 23
  - Francesco Carandini, Italian poet (b. 1858)
  - Ernest Thompson Seton, Canadian-American author, wildlife artist, founder of the Woodcraft Indians (b. 1860)
- October 24 – Kurt Daluege, German Nazi officer, SS general and police official, war criminal (executed) (b. 1897)
- October 25 – Rudolf Walden, Finnish industrialist and a military leader (b. 1878)
- October 26
  - Ioannis Rallis, prime minister of Greece during the Axis occupation of Greece (b. 1878)
  - Jules Brulatour, American film prodicer (b. 1870)
- October 27 – Nathan Francis Mossell, African-American physician (b. 1856)

=== November ===
- November 2 – John Barrett, British clergyman, Roman Catholic bishop and reverend (b. 1878)
- November 4
  - Rüdiger von der Goltz, German general (b. 1865)
  - Semyon Bychkov, Soviet military pilot during World War II (b. 1918)
  - Ferenc Szombathelyi, Hungarian military officer (executed) (b. 1887)
- November 5 – Joseph Stella, Italian-American painter (b. 1877)
- November 6 – Maria Innocentia Hummel, German Franciscan religious sister and blessed (b. 1909)
- November 7 – Henry Lehrman, American actor (b. 1886)
- November 10 – Baldassare Forestiere, Italian immigrant to America (b. 1879)
- November 11 – Nikolay Burdenko, Soviet surgeon, founder of Soviet neurosurgery (b. 1876)
- November 12 – Camillo Caccia Dominioni, Italian Roman Catholic cardinal, eminence (b. 1877)
- November 14 – Manuel de Falla, Spanish composer (b. 1876)
- November 18
  - Donald Meek, British actor (b. 1878)
  - Jimmy Walker, former mayor of New York City (b. 1881)
  - Vincentas Borisevičius, Lithuanian Roman Catholic bishop of the Telšiai Diocese (b. 1887)
- November 23 – Léon Spilliaert, Belgian symbolist painter and graphic artist (b. 1881)
- November 24
  - László Moholy-Nagy, Hungarian painter, photographer (b. 1895)
  - Samuel Walder, Australian businessman and politician (b. 1879)
- November 25 – George Gandy, American entrepreneur (b. 1851)
- November 26 – Sultana Racho Petrova, Bulgarian memoirist (b. 1869)
- November 28 – Maria Izabela Wiłucka-Kowalska, Polish Roman Catholic religious leader, saint (b. 1890)
- November 30 – Gustav Noske, German politician (b. 1868)

=== December ===
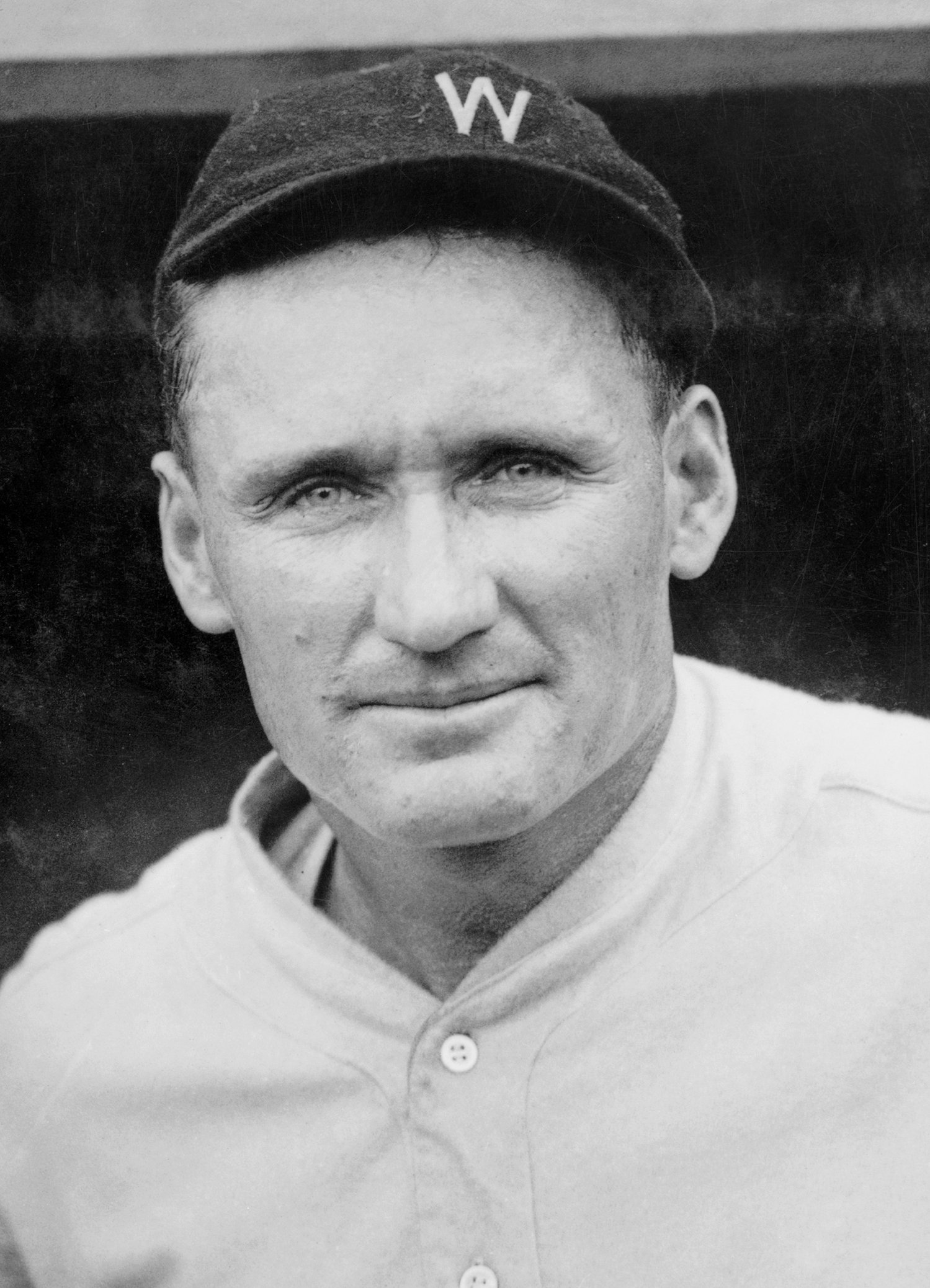
Walter Johnson

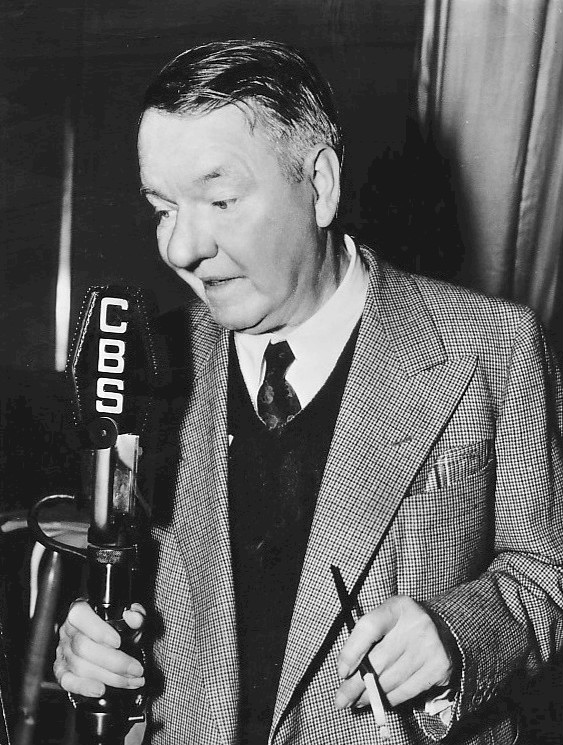
W. C. Fields

- December 5 – Louis Dewis, Belgian Post-Impressionist painter (b. 1872)
- December 6
  - Charles Stewart, Canadian politician, Premier of Alberta (b. 1868)
  - Elma Yerburgh, member of the Thwaites family who was owner of Thwaites Brewery (b. 1864)
  - Charles Stanton, British politician (b. 1873)
  - Maximilian Steinberg, Russian composer ( b. 1883)
- December 7
  - Laurette Taylor, American actress (b. 1884)
  - Sada Yacco, Japanese stage actress (b. 1871)
- December 9 – Maurice Dior, French industrialist, father of Christian Dior (b. 1872)
- December 10
  - Walter Johnson, American baseball player (Washington Senators), MLB Hall of Famer (b. 1887)
  - Damon Runyon, American writer (b. 1880)
- December 12
  - Ben Carter, American actor (b. 1910)
  - Renée Falconetti, French actress (b. 1892)
- December 14
  - Tom Dowse, Irish major league baseball player in the 1890s (b. 1866)
  - Ioan Alexandru Brătescu-Voinești, Romanian short story writer and politician (b. 1868)
- December 16 – Salman al-Murshid, Syrian religious leader, political figure (b. 1907)
- December 17 – Constance Garnett, English translator of nineteenth-century Russian literature (b. 1861)
- December 18 – Moses Russell, Welsh international footballer (b. 1888)
- December 20 – Einosuke Harada, Japanese ophthalmologist (b. 1892)
- December 21
  - Eugene Talmadge, American politician (b. 1884)
  - Ali Mahmud, Egyptian Quran reciter, religious chanter and composer (b. 1878)
- December 22 – Pierre Bénard, French journalist (b. 1898)
- December 23
  - John A. Sampson, American gynecologist (b. 1873)
  - Virginia Walker, American model and film actress (b. 1908)
- December 25
  - W. C. Fields, American actor, comedian (b. 1880)
  - Henri Le Fauconnier, French painter (b. 1881)
- December 26 – Franjo Bučar, Yugoslav writer (b. 1866)
- December 27
  - Pedro Mata Dominguez, Spanish novelist, playwright and poet (b. 1875)
  - Dick Condon, Australian rules footballer (b. 1876)
- December 28
  - Carrie Jacobs-Bond, American singer, songwriter (b. 1862)
  - Francis Salabert, French publisher (b. 1884)
- December 29
  - John Babington Macaulay Baxter, Canadian politician, 19th Premier of New Brunswick (b. 1858)
  - Georg Thomas, German general during World War II (b. 1890)
- December 30 – Charles Wakefield Cadman, American composer (b. 1881)

=== Date unknown ===
- Armanda Degli Abbati, Italian opera singer (b. 1879)
- Robert M. Washburn, American politician and writer (b. 1868)
- Jack White, Irish republican and libertarian socialist (b. 1879)
- Thiounn, Cambodian state official of the Khmer nobility during the French protectorate of Cambodia (b. 1864)
- Charles Trussell, British musician (b. 1860)
- Frona Eunice Wait, American writer and journalist (b. 1859)
- Charles W. Stage, American attorney, politician, professional baseball umpire and track athlete (b. 1868)
- Jessica Borthwick, British adventurer, sculptor and filmmaker (b. 1888)
- Charles Edgar Corea, Sri Lankan politician and freedom fighter (b. 1866)

== Nobel Prizes ==

- Physics – Percy Williams Bridgman
- Chemistry – James B. Sumner, John Howard Northrop, Wendell Meredith Stanley
- Physiology or Medicine – Hermann Joseph Muller
- Literature – Hermann Hesse
- Peace – Emily Greene Balch, John Mott
