= 1946 in the United States =

- Decades: 1920s; 1930s; 1940s; 1950s; 1960s
- See also: History of the United States (1945–1964); Timeline of United States history (1930–1949); List of years in the United States

Events from the year 1946 in the United States.

== Incumbents ==
=== Federal government ===
- President: Harry S. Truman (D-Missouri)
- Vice President: vacant
- Chief Justice:

Harlan F. Stone (New York) (until April 22)
Fred M. Vinson (Kentucky) (starting June 24)

- Speaker of the House of Representatives: Sam Rayburn (D-Texas)
- Senate Majority Leader: Alben W. Barkley (D-Kentucky)
- Congress: 79th

==== State governments ====
Governors and lieutenant governors

=== Governors ===
- Governor of Alabama: Chauncey Sparks (Democratic)
- Governor of Arizona: Sidney Preston Osborn (Democratic)
- Governor of Arkansas: Benjamin Travis Laney (Democratic)
- Governor of California: Earl Warren (Republican)
- Governor of Colorado: John Charles Vivian (Republican)
- Governor of Connecticut: Raymond E. Baldwin (Republican) (until December 27), Charles W. Snow (Democratic) (starting December 27)
- Governor of Delaware: Walter W. Bacon (Republican)
- Governor of Florida: Millard F. Caldwell (Democratic)
- Governor of Georgia: Ellis Arnall (Democratic)
- Governor of Idaho: Arnold Williams (Democratic)
- Governor of Illinois: Dwight H. Green (Republican)
- Governor of Indiana: Ralph F. Gates (Republican)
- Governor of Iowa: Robert D. Blue (Republican)
- Governor of Kansas: Andrew F. Schoeppel (Republican)
- Governor of Kentucky: Simeon S. Willis (Republican)
- Governor of Louisiana: Jimmie H. Davis (Democratic)
- Governor of Maine: Horace A. Hildreth (Republican)
- Governor of Maryland: Herbert R. O'Conor (Democratic)
- Governor of Massachusetts: Maurice J. Tobin (Democratic)
- Governor of Michigan: Harry Kelly (Republican)
- Governor of Minnesota: Edward John Thye (Republican)
- Governor of Mississippi: Thomas L. Bailey (Democratic) (until November 2), Fielding L. Wright (Democratic) (starting November 2)
- Governor of Missouri: Phil M. Donnelly (Democratic)
- Governor of Montana: Sam C. Ford (Republican)
- Governor of Nebraska: Dwight Griswold (Republican)
- Governor of Nevada: Vail M. Pittman (Democratic)
- Governor of New Hampshire: Charles M. Dale (Republican)
- Governor of New Jersey: Walter Evans Edge (Republican)
- Governor of New Mexico: John J. Dempsey (Democratic)
- Governor of New York: Thomas Dewey (Republican)
- Governor of North Carolina: R. Gregg Cherry (Democratic)
- Governor of North Dakota: Fred G. Aandahl (Republican)
- Governor of Ohio: Frank J. Lausche (Democratic)
- Governor of Oklahoma: Robert S. Kerr (Democratic)
- Governor of Oregon: Earl Snell (Republican)
- Governor of Pennsylvania: Edward Martin (Republican)
- Governor of Rhode Island: John Orlando Pastore (Democratic)
- Governor of South Carolina: Ransome Judson Williams (Democratic)
- Governor of South Dakota: Merrill Q. Sharpe (Republican)
- Governor of Tennessee: Jim Nance McCord (Democratic)
- Governor of Texas: Coke R. Stevenson (Democratic)
- Governor of Utah: Herbert B. Maw (Democratic)
- Governor of Vermont: Mortimer R. Proctor (Republican)
- Governor of Virginia: Colgate Darden (Democratic) (until January 16), William M. Tuck (Democratic) (starting January 16)
- Governor of Washington: Monrad C. Wallgren (Democratic)
- Governor of West Virginia: Clarence W. Meadows (Democratic)
- Governor of Wisconsin: Walter S. Goodland (Republican)
- Governor of Wyoming: Lester C. Hunt (Democratic)

=== Lieutenant governors ===
- Lieutenant Governor of Alabama: Leven H. Ellis (Democratic)
- Lieutenant Governor of Arkansas: James Lavesque Shaver (Democratic)
- Lieutenant Governor of California: Frederick F. Houser (Republican)
- Lieutenant Governor of Colorado: William Eugene Higby (Republican)
- Lieutenant Governor of Connecticut: Charles Wilbert Snow (Democratic) (until December 27), vacant (starting December 27)
- Lieutenant Governor of Delaware: Elbert N. Carvel (Democratic)
- Lieutenant Governor of Idaho: vacant (until March 20), A. R. McCabe (Democratic) (starting March 20)
- Lieutenant Governor of Illinois: Hugh W. Cross (Republican)
- Lieutenant Governor of Indiana: Richard T. James (Republican)
- Lieutenant Governor of Iowa: Kenneth A. Evans (Republican)
- Lieutenant Governor of Kansas: Jess C. Denious (Republican)
- Lieutenant Governor of Kentucky: Kenneth H. Tuggle (Republican)
- Lieutenant Governor of Louisiana: J. Emile Verret (Democratic)
- Lieutenant Governor of Massachusetts: vacant
- Lieutenant Governor of Michigan: Vernon J. Brown (Republican)
- Lieutenant Governor of Minnesota: C. Elmer Anderson (Republican)
- Lieutenant Governor of Mississippi: Fielding L. Wright (Republican) (until November 2), vacant (starting November 2)
- Lieutenant Governor of Missouri: Walter Naylor Davis (Democratic)
- Lieutenant Governor of Montana: Ernest T. Eaton (Republican)
- Lieutenant Governor of Nebraska: Roy W. Johnson (Republican)
- Lieutenant Governor of Nevada: vacant
- Lieutenant Governor of New Mexico: James B. Jones (Democratic)
- Lieutenant Governor of New York: Joseph R. Hanley (Republican)
- Lieutenant Governor of North Carolina: Lynton Y. Ballentine (Democratic)
- Lieutenant Governor of North Dakota: Clarence P. Dahl (Republican)
- Lieutenant Governor of Ohio: George D. Nye (Democratic)
- Lieutenant Governor of Oklahoma: James E. Berry (Democratic)
- Lieutenant Governor of Pennsylvania: John C. Bell, Jr. (Republican)
- Lieutenant Governor of Rhode Island: vacant
- Lieutenant Governor of South Carolina: vacant
- Lieutenant Governor of South Dakota: Sioux K. Grigsby (Republican)
- Lieutenant Governor of Tennessee: Larry Morgan (Democratic)
- Lieutenant Governor of Texas: John Lee Smith (Democratic)
- Lieutenant Governor of Vermont: Lee E. Emerson (Republican)
- Lieutenant Governor of Virginia: William M. Tuck (Democratic) (until January 16), Lewis Preston Collins II (Democratic) (starting January 16)
- Lieutenant Governor of Washington: Victor A. Meyers (Democratic)
- Lieutenant Governor of Wisconsin: Oscar Rennebohm (Republican)

== Events ==
=== January–March ===
March 5: In Missouri, Churchill speaks on the "Iron Curtain"

- January 6 – A revised revival of Jerome Kern and Oscar Hammerstein II's Show Boat opens on Broadway at the Ziegfeld Theatre.
- January 17 – U.S. Senator Dennis Chávez (D-NM) calls for a vote on a Fair Employment Practice Committee bill which calls for an end to discrimination in the workplace. A filibuster prevents it from passing.
- January 25 – The United Mine Workers rejoins the American Federation of Labor.
- January 29 – The Central Intelligence Group is established (the CIA in 1947).
- February 12 – Isaac Woodard, an African American army veteran, is beaten and blinded by police chief Lynwood Shull in Batesburg, South Carolina, an event which is brought to national attention on Orson Welles's radio show.
- February 14 – ENIAC (for "Electronic Numerical Integrator and Computer"), the first general-purpose electronic computer, is unveiled at the University of Pennsylvania.
- February 18 – President Truman signs the Rescission Act of 1946 annulling benefits payable to Filipino troops who fought for the U.S. during World War II.
- February 28 – In Philadelphia, General Electric strikers and police clash.
- March 5 – In his speech at Westminster College, in Fulton, Missouri, Winston Churchill popularizes the political metaphor of the Iron Curtain.
- March 6 – Vietnam War: Ho Chi Minh signs an agreement with France which recognizes Vietnam as an autonomous state in the Indochinese Federation and the French Union.
- March 7 – The 18th Academy Awards ceremony, hosted by James Stewart and Bob Hope, is held at Grauman's Chinese Theatre in Hollywood, Los Angeles, the first ceremony after World War II. Billy Wilder's The Lost Weekend wins the most awards with four, including Best Motion Picture and Best Director for Wilder. Leo McCarey's The Bells of St. Mary's receives the most nominations with eight.
- March 21 – The Los Angeles Rams of the National Football League, newly relocated from Cleveland, sign Kenny Washington, making him the first African American player in the league since 1933.
- March 24 – BBC Home Service radio in the United Kingdom broadcasts Alistair Cooke's first American Letter. As Letter from America, this programme will continue until a few weeks before Cooke's death in 2004.

=== April–June ===
- April 1 – The 8.6 M_{w} Aleutian Islands earthquake affects Alaska with a maximum Mercalli intensity of VI (Strong), causing a destructive basin wide tsunami, leaving 165–173 dead.
- April 18 – The United States recognizes Josip Broz Tito's government in Yugoslavia.
- April 20 – Walt Disney's eighth feature film, Make Mine Music, is released. It is Disney's third of six package films to be released through the 1940s.
- April 22 – Girouard v. United States, a citizenship case decided in the Supreme Court, overturns the decision in United States v. Schwimmer (1929).
- April 23
  - The Eastern Pennsylvania Basketball League (later the Continental Basketball Association (CBA)) is founded.
  - Howard Hughes's Western movie The Outlaw (1943), starring Jane Russell, goes on general release.
- May 2 – Six inmates unsuccessfully try to escape from Alcatraz Federal Penitentiary in San Francisco Bay; a riot occurs, the "Battle of Alcatraz".
- May 10 – The first V-2 rocket to be successfully launched in the U.S. is fired from White Sands Missile Range.
- May 21 – Manhattan Project physicist Dr. Louis Slotin accidentally triggers a fission reaction at the Los Alamos National Laboratory and, although saving his coworkers, gives himself a lethal dose of hard radiation, making him the second victim of a criticality accident in history (the incident is initially treated as classified information).
- May 23 – Dwarf Grill, predecessor of Chick-fil-A, a fast food chicken restaurant, is founded in Georgia.
- June 6 – The Basketball Association of America is formed in New York City, later renamed the National Basketball Association.
- June 14 – U.S. representative Bernard Baruch presents a proposal to the United Nations Atomic Energy Commission for the creation of an international Atomic Development Authority, with the goal of preventing unchecked nuclear proliferation.
- June 17
  - The 1946 Windsor-Tecumseh, Ontario tornado on the Detroit River kills 17.
  - Laurence Olivier's Henry V opens in the United States nearly 2 years after its release in the UK. It is the first Shakespeare film in color, and critics hail it as the finest film of a Shakespeare play ever made.

=== July–September ===
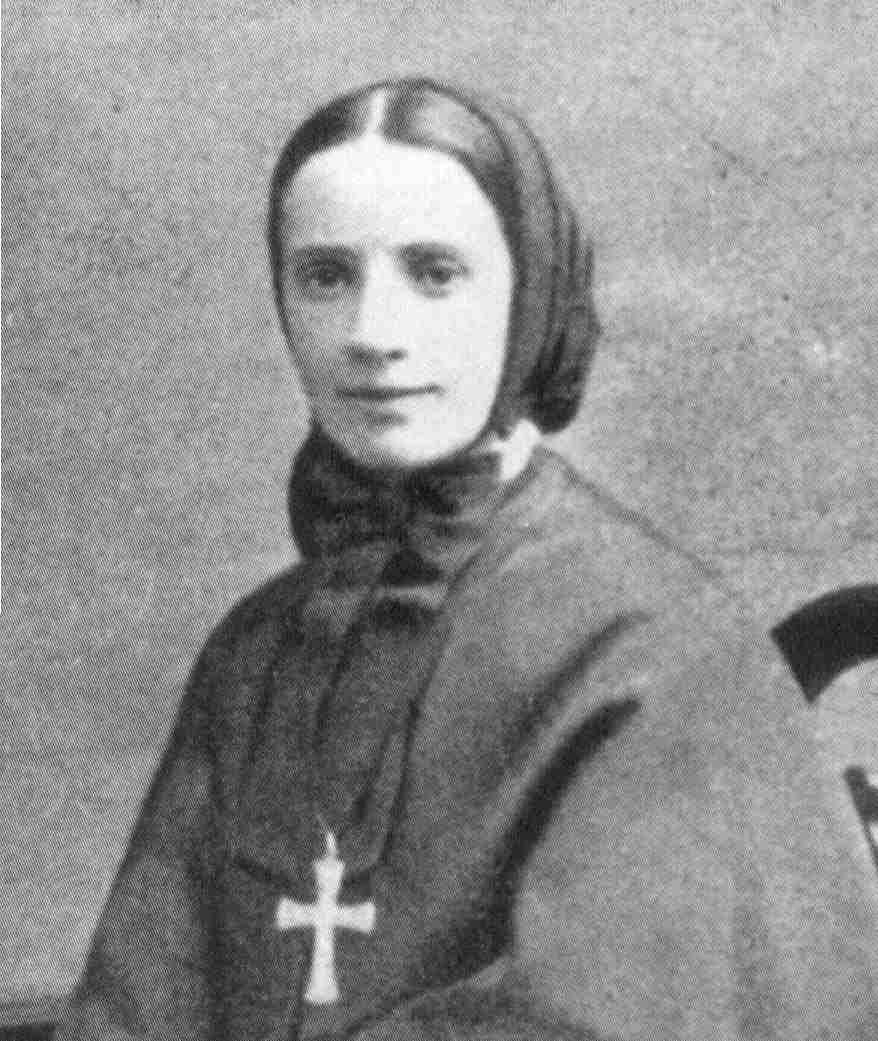
July 7: Saint Frances Xavier Cabrini

- July 4 – The Philippines is granted independence by the United States.
- July 7
  - Mother Frances Xavier Cabrini becomes the first American to be canonized by the Roman Catholic Church.
  - Howard Hughes nearly dies when a test flight of the Hughes XF-11 crashes in a Beverly Hills neighborhood due to a propeller malfunction.
- July 14 – Benjamin Spock's influential The Common Sense Book of Baby and Child Care is published.
- July 25
  - Nuclear testing: In the first underwater test of the atomic bomb, the surplus USS Saratoga is sunk near Bikini Atoll in the Pacific Ocean, when the United States detonates the Baker device during Operation Crossroads.
  - At Club 500 in Atlantic City, New Jersey, Dean Martin and Jerry Lewis stage their first show as a comedy team.
  - 1946 Georgia lynching: In the last mass lynching in the United States, a mob of white men shoot and kill two African-American couples near Moore's Ford Bridge in Georgia.
- August 1
  - President Truman signs the Atomic Energy Act of 1946, which establishes the United States Atomic Energy Commission.
  - The Fulbright Program, a system of U.S. international educational exchange scholarships, is established.
- August 25 – American golfer Ben Hogan wins the PGA Championship.
- September 15 – DuMont Television Network begins broadcasting regularly.
- September 22 – Yogi Berra makes his Major League Baseball debut, entering a game for the New York Yankees against the Philadelphia A's and hitting a home run in his first time at bat.
- September 24 – White House counsel Clark Clifford presents President Truman with a top secret report authored by George Elsey on American Relations with the Soviet Union which forms the basis of the U.S. policy of containment.

=== October–December ===
- October 15 – The St. Louis Cardinals defeat the Boston Red Sox, 4 games to 3, to win their 6th World Series.
- October 16 – The United Nations' first meeting in Long Island is held.
- November 1 – The New York Knicks play against the Toronto Huskies at the Maple Leaf Gardens, in the first Basketball Association of America game. The Knicks win 68–66.
- November 6 – Senate and House elections in the United States both give majorities to the Republicans.
- November 12 – In Chicago, a branch of the Exchange National Bank (later part of the LaSalle Bank) opens the first 10 drive-up teller windows.
- November 25 – In St. Paul, Minnesota, over a thousand public school teachers go on strike for more than a month.
- November 27 – Cold War: Indian Prime Minister Jawaharlal Nehru appeals to the United States and the Soviet Union to end nuclear testing and to start nuclear disarmament, stating that such an action would "save humanity from the ultimate disaster."
- December 2 – The International Convention for the Regulation of Whaling is signed in Washington, D.C. to "provide for the proper conservation of whale stocks and thus make possible the orderly development of the whaling industry" through establishment of the International Whaling Commission.
- December 5 – President Truman establishes the President's Committee on Civil Rights to investigate the status of civil rights in the United States and propose measures to strengthen and protect the civil rights of American citizens.
- December 7 – A fire at the Winecoff Hotel in Atlanta, Georgia kills 119.
- December 14
  - Proposed United States purchase of Greenland from Denmark: An offer is made through diplomatic channels.
  - Aspen Skiing Company opens Aspen Mountain (ski area) in Colorado with Ski Lift No. 1, at 6,800 ft (2.1 km) the world's longest chairlift at this time.
- December 20 – Frank Capra's It's a Wonderful Life, featuring James Stewart, Donna Reed, Lionel Barrymore, Henry Travers and Thomas Mitchell, is released in New York.
- December 22 – The Havana Conference begins between U.S. organized crime bosses in Havana, Cuba.
- December 26 – The Flamingo Hotel opens on the Las Vegas Strip.
- December 31 – President Harry S. Truman delivers Proclamation 2714, which officially ends hostilities in World War II.

=== Undated ===
- Airport Homes race riots in Chicago.
- The 20 mm M61 Vulcan Gatling gun contract is released.
- The All-America Football Conference team San Francisco 49ers is formed.
- The first Tupperware is sold in department and hardware stores in the United States.
- Binghamton University is founded in New York (state).

== Births ==
Bill Clinton (born August 19), the 42nd president (1993–2001)

George W. Bush (born July 6), the 43rd president (2001–2009)

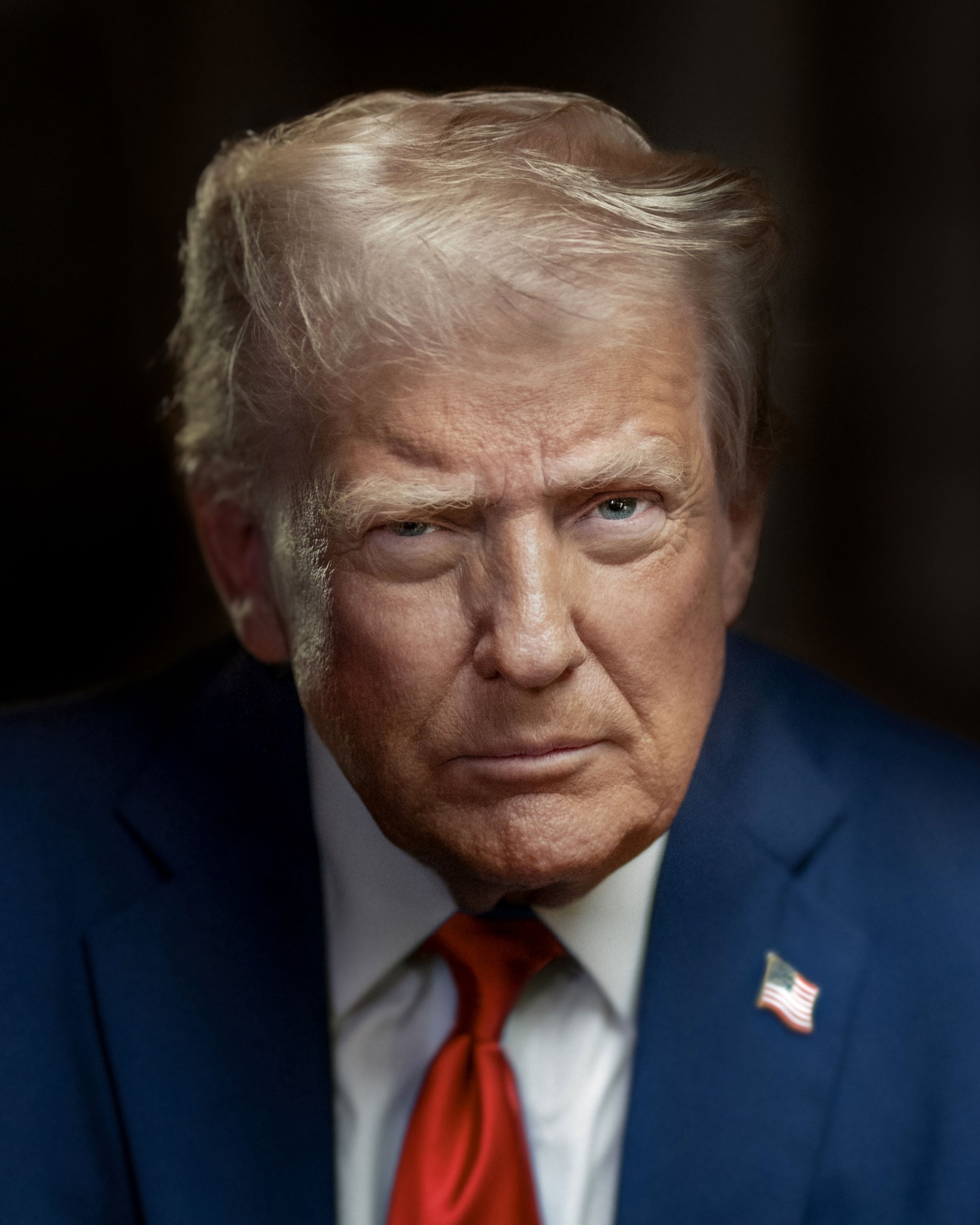
Donald Trump (born June 14), the 45th and 47th president (2017–2021 and since 2025)

Three U.S. presidents were born in the year 1946

=== January ===
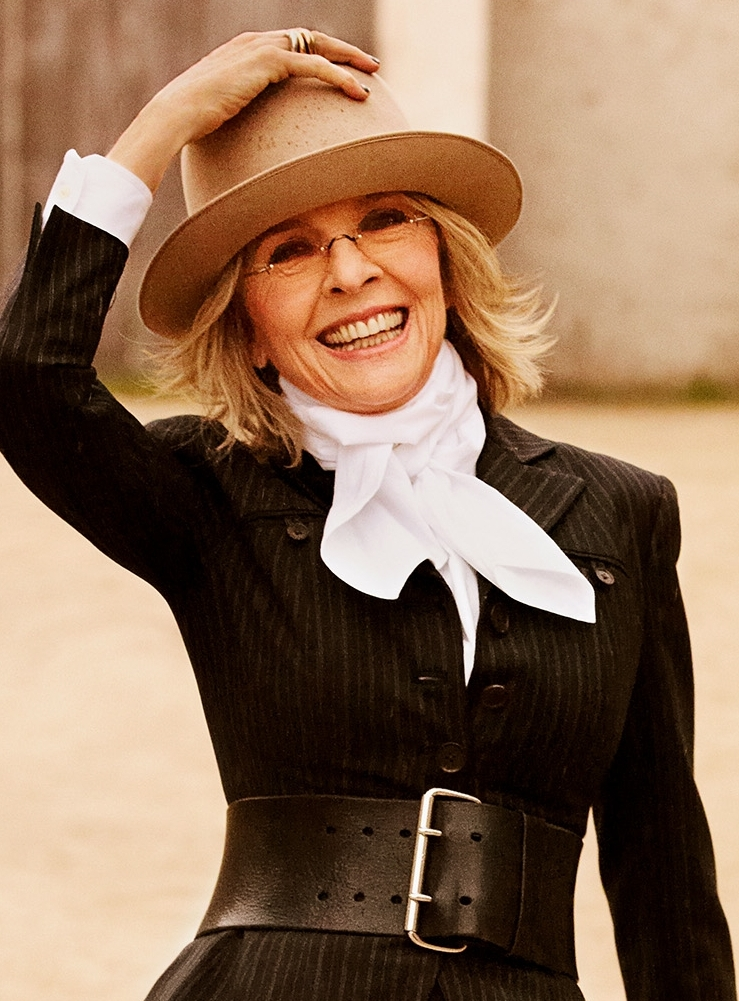
Diane Keaton

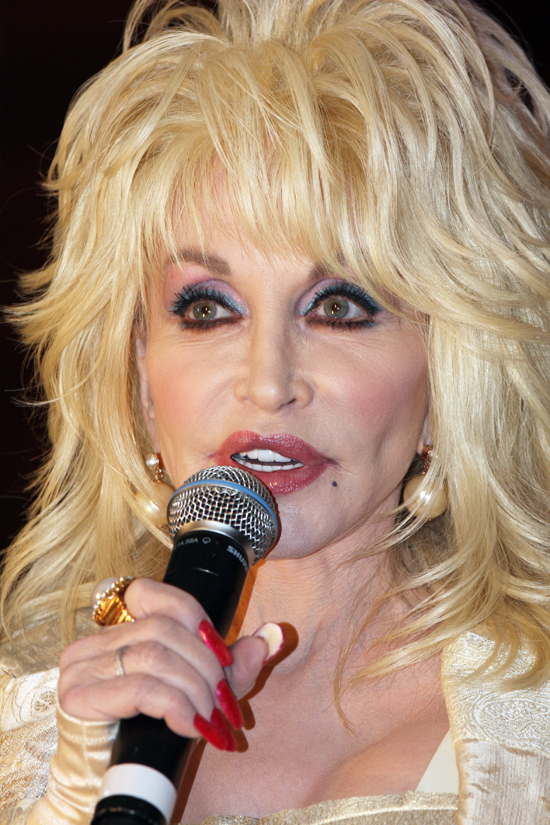
Dolly Parton

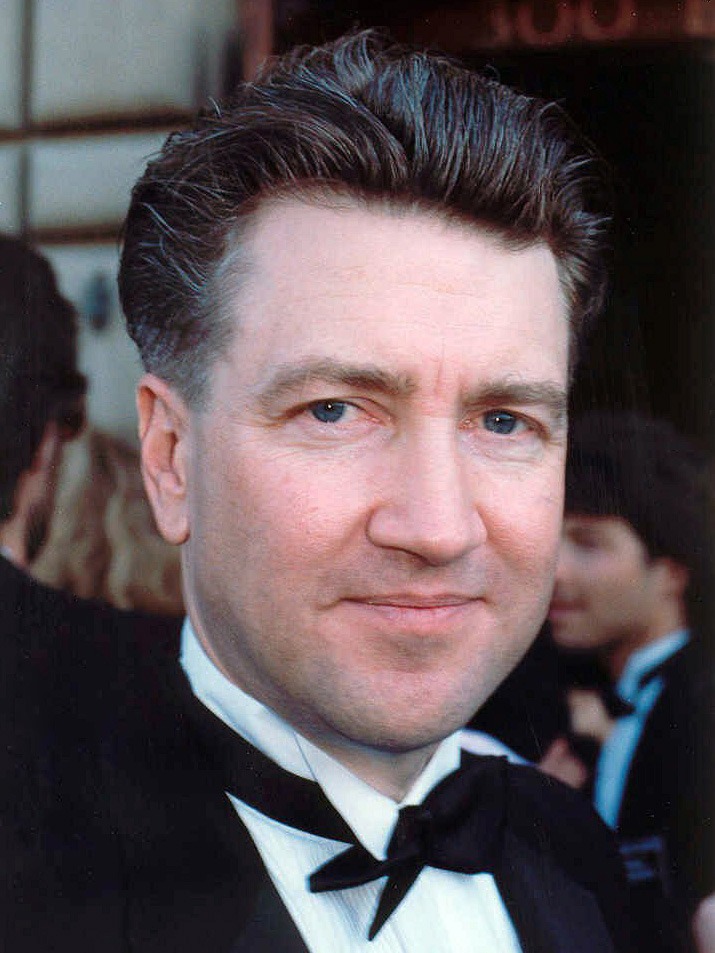
David Lynch

- January 1
  - Rick Hurst, American actor (d. 2025)
  - Shelby Steele, American journalist, author and director
- January 3 – Cissy King, American dancer, singer
- January 4 – Diana Ewing, American actress
- January 5 – Diane Keaton, American actress, film director (Annie Hall) (d. 2025)
- January 7
  - Michele Elliott, author, psychologist and founder of child protection charity Kidscape
  - Michael Roizen, American anesthesiologist and author
- January 8
  - Robby Krieger, American rock musician (The Doors)
  - Stanton Peele, American psychologist
- January 11
  - Naomi Judd, American country singer (d. 2022)
  - John Piper, American theologian
- January 12 – George Duke, African-American musician (d. 2013)
- January 16 – Michael Coats, American astronaut
- January 19 – Dolly Parton, American singer-songwriter, actress, businesswoman and philanthropist (d. 2026)
- January 20 – David Lynch, American film director (d. 2025)
- January 21 – Johnny Oates, American baseball player, manager (d. 2004)
- January 23 – Don Whittington, American race car driver
- January 25 – Doc Bundy, American race car driver and technician
- January 26
  - Deon Jackson, American singer-songwriter (d. 2014)
  - Gene Siskel, American film critic (Sneak Previews) (d. 1999)
- January 27 – Nedra Talley, African-American singer (The Ronettes)
- January 29 – Bettye LaVette, African-American soul singer, songwriter
- January 31 – Terry Kath, American rock musician (Chicago) (d. 1978)

=== February ===
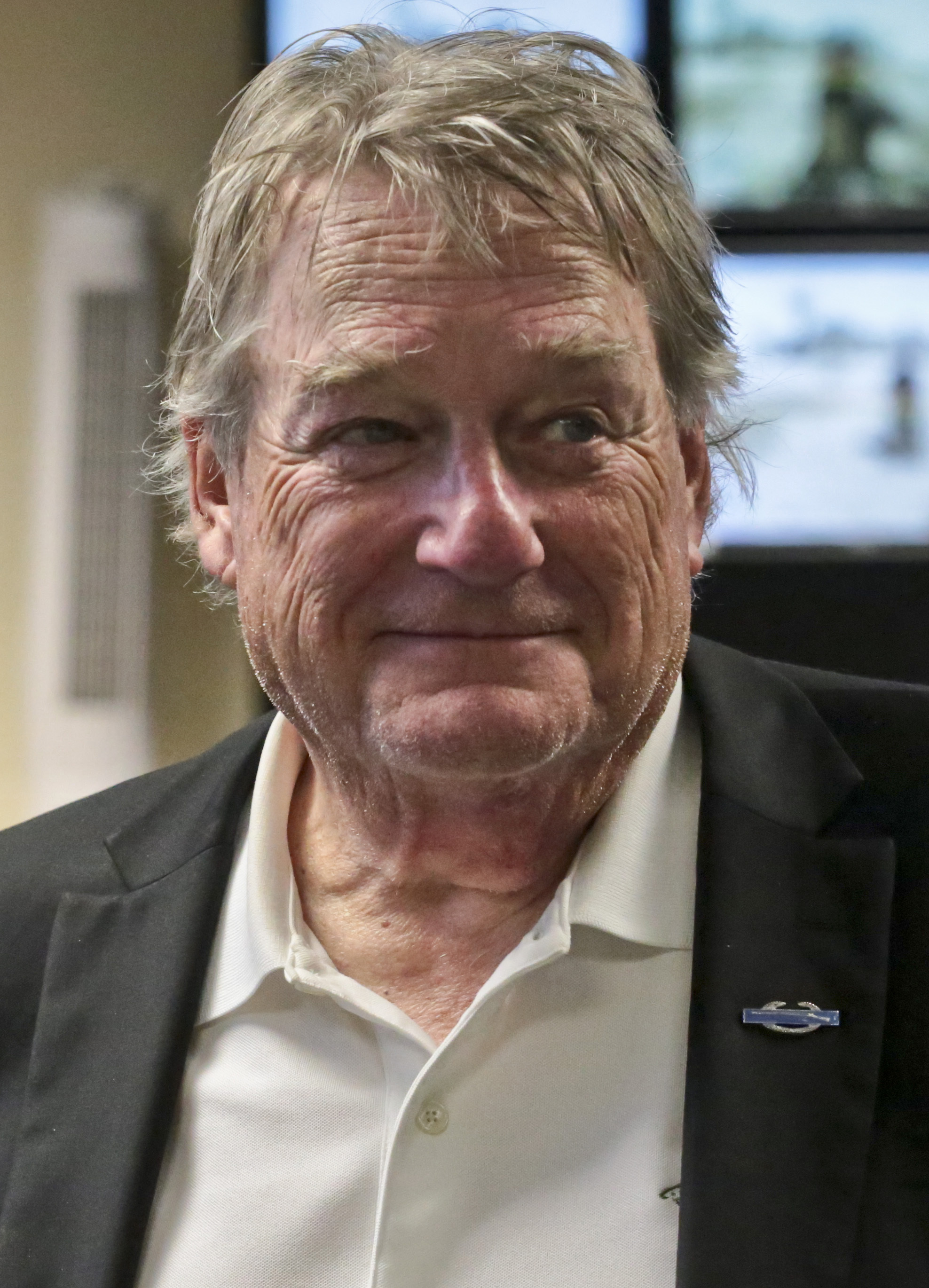
Blake Clark

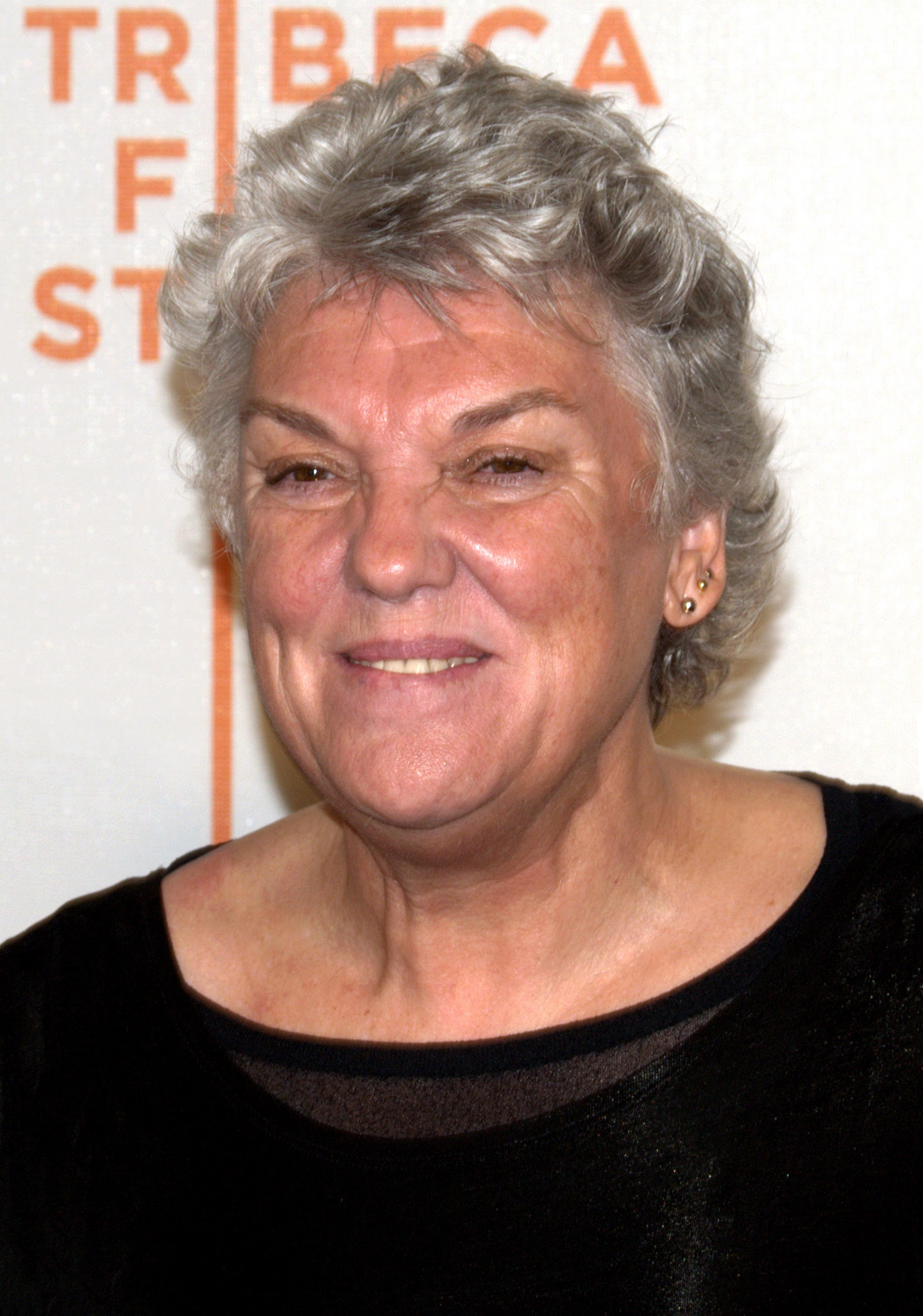
Tyne Daly

- February 2 – Blake Clark, American actor, comedian
- February 6 – Jim Turner, American politician
- February 7
  - Tom Hicks, American investor and sports team owner (d. 2025)
  - Sammy Johns, American singer-songwriter (d. 2013)
- February 9 – Jim Webb, American politician
- February 11 – Chris Rush, American stand-up comedian (d. 2018)
- February 13
  - Richard Blumenthal, American politician
  - Joe Estevez, American actor
- February 14 – Gregory Hines, African-American dancer, actor (d. 2003)
- February 16 – Marvin Sease, American blues and soul singer-songwriter (d. 2011)
- February 19 – Karen Silkwood, American activist (d. 1974)
- February 20
  - Sandy Duncan, American singer, dancer, comedian and actress
  - J. Geils, American guitarist (The J. Geils Band) (d. 2017)
- February 21
  - Tyne Daly, American actress (Cagney & Lacey)
  - Monica Johnson, American screenwriter (d. 2010)
  - Jim Ryan, American politician and lawyer (d. 2022)
- February 25 – Rick Hummel, American sportswriter (d. 2023)
- February 28
  - Don Ciccone, American singer, songwriter (The Critters) (d. 2016)
  - Don Francisco, American Christian musician
  - Syreeta Wright, African-American singer, songwriter ("With You I'm Born Again") (d. 2004)

=== March ===
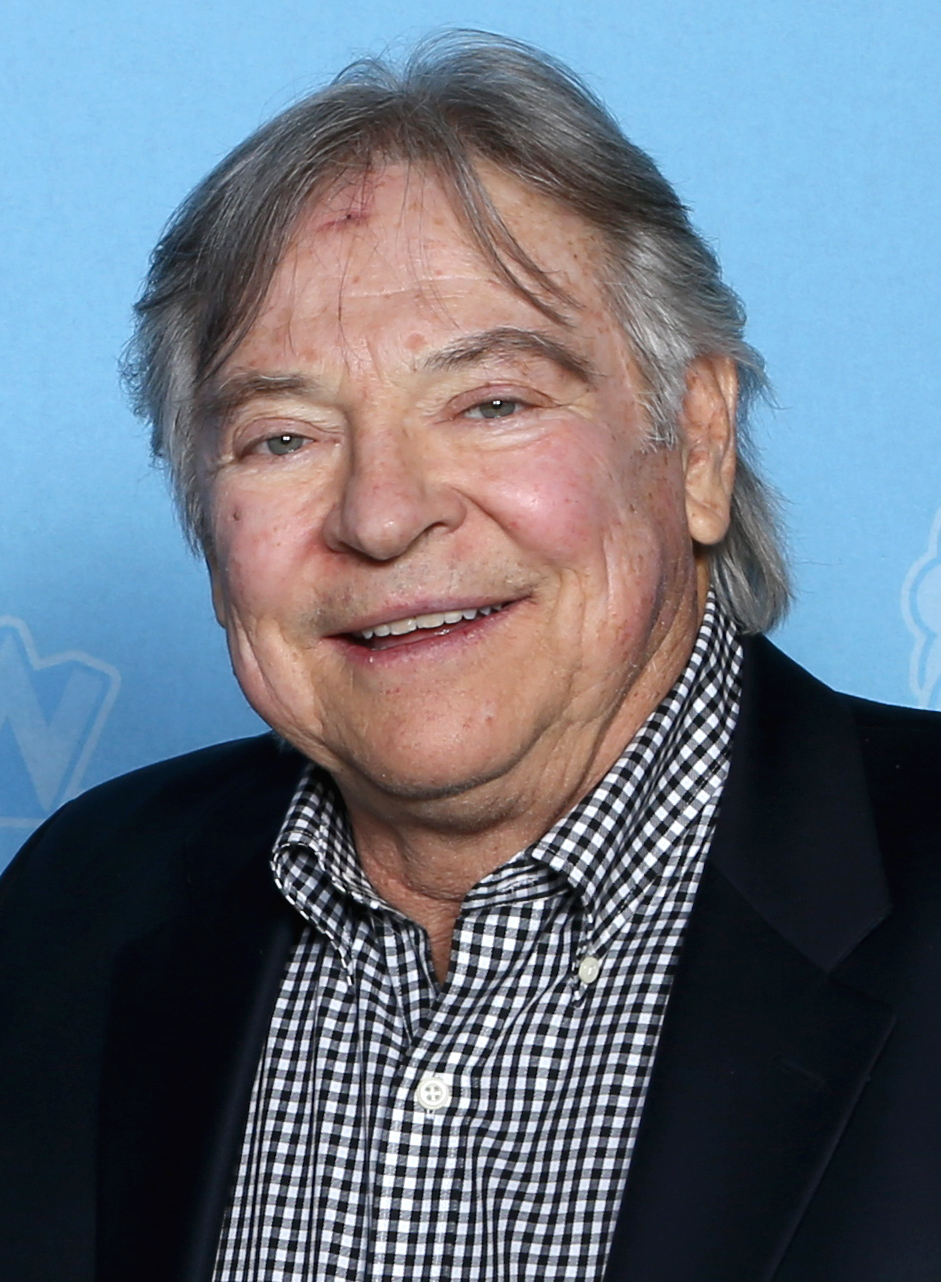
Frank Welker

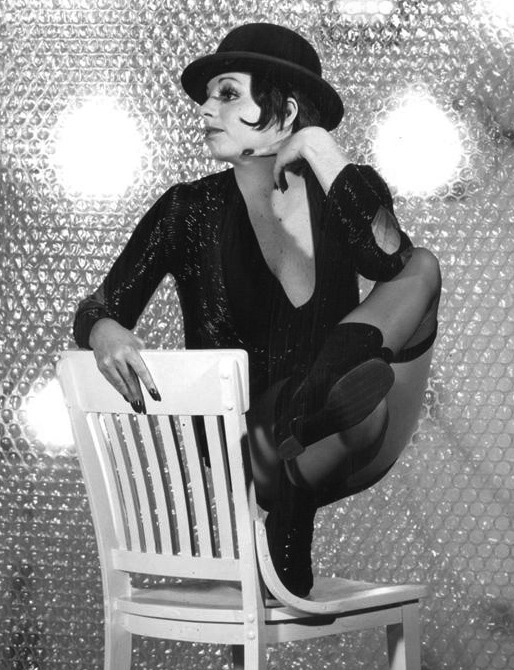
Liza Minnelli

- March 1 – Lana Wood, American actress, producer
- March 7
  - John Heard, American actor (d. 2017)
  - Peter Wolf, American rock musician (The J. Geils Band)
- March 8 – Randy Meisner, American musician (The Eagles) (d. 2023)
- March 10 – Mike Davis, American scholar (d. 2022)
- March 12
  - Frank Welker, American voice actor, singer
  - Liza Minnelli, American singer, actress
- March 13 – Yonatan Netanyahu, American-born Israeli soldier (d. 1976 in Israel)
- March 15 – Bobby Bonds, American baseball player, manager (d. 2003)
- March 17 – Larry Langford, American politician (d. 2019)
- March 19 – Pudgy, American comedian (d. 2007)
- March 24 – Kitty O'Neil, speed record holder and stuntwoman (d. 2018)
- March 26 – Johnny Crawford, American child actor, musician (The Rifleman) (d. 2021)
- March 27 – Mike Jackson, American former MLB pitcher

=== April ===
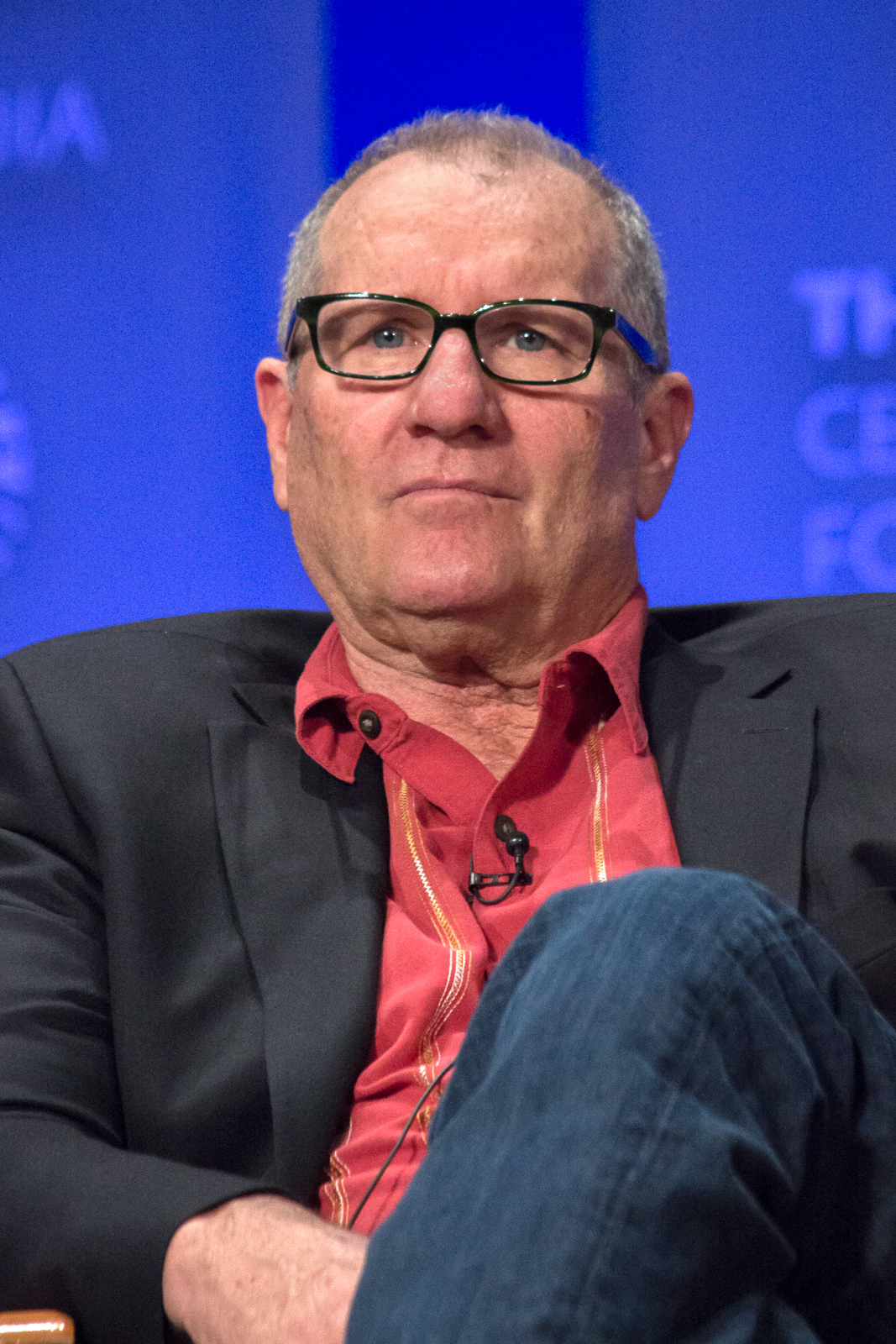
Ed O'Neill

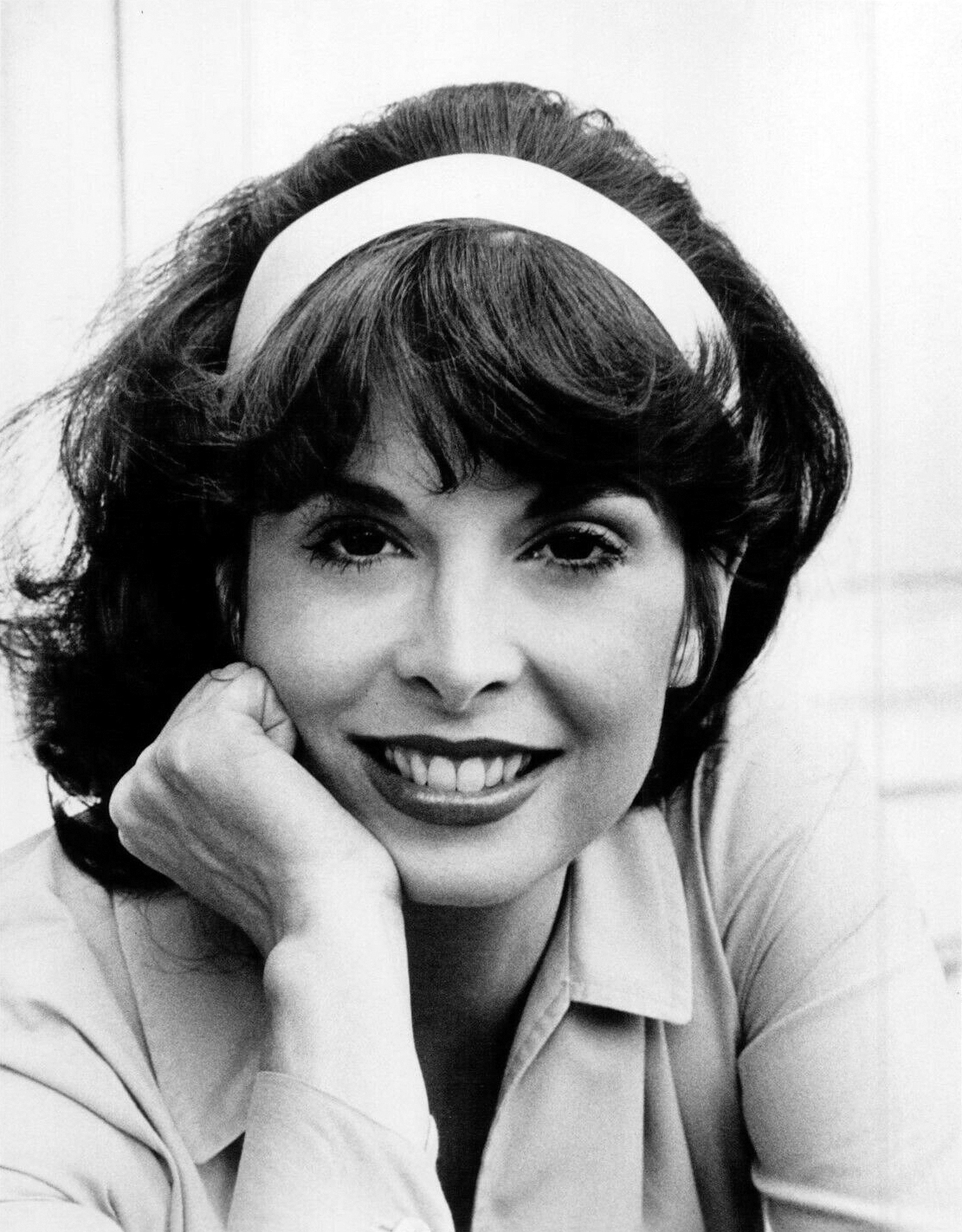
Talia Shire

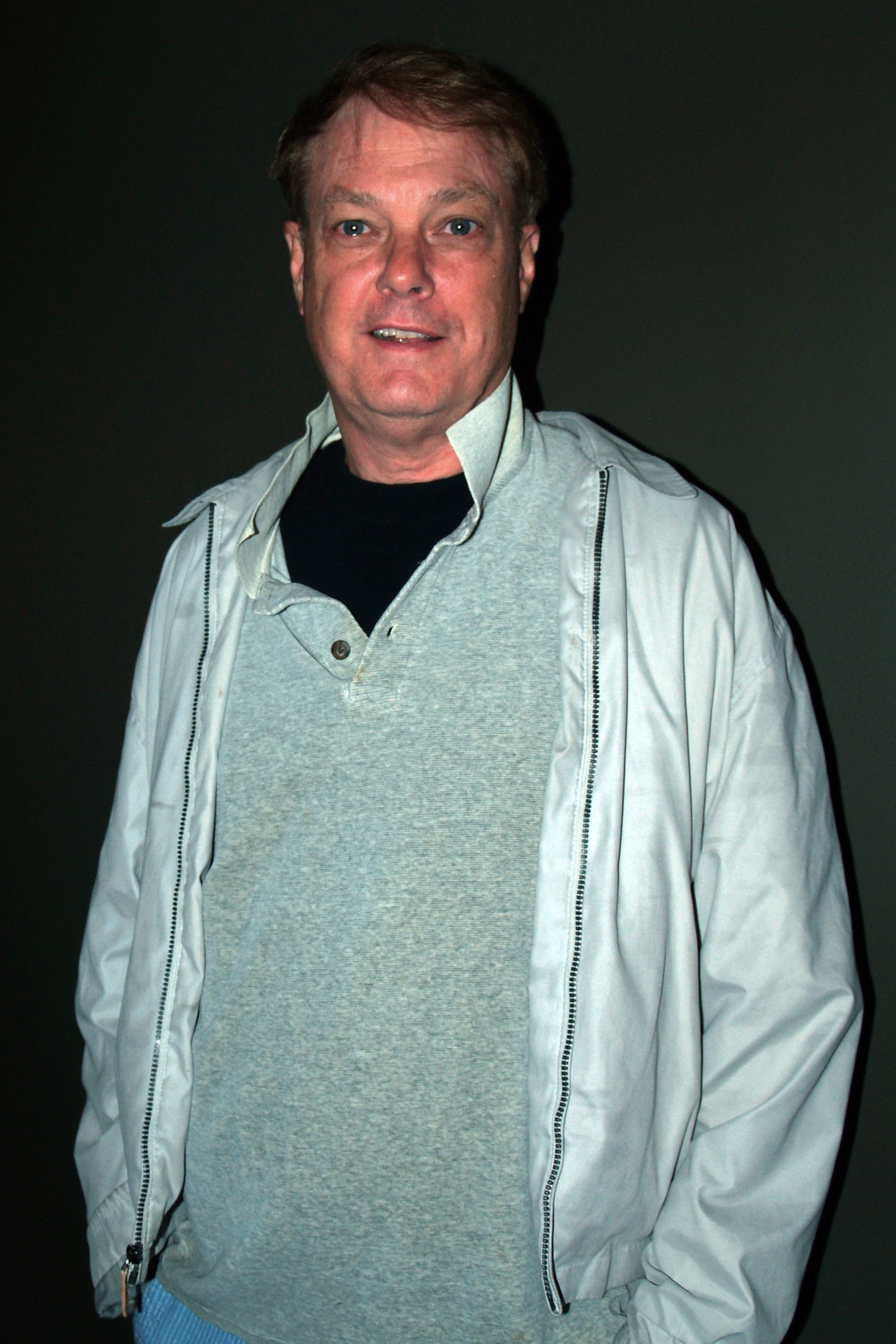
Bill Plympton

- April 2 – Dickie Drake, Air Force veteran and Alabamian politician
- April 3 – Rod Gaspar, baseball player
- April 7 – Robert Metcalfe, computer scientist and entrepreneur
- April 8
  - Catfish Hunter, baseball player (d. 1999)
  - Tim Thomerson, actor, comedian
- April 9 – Nate Colbert, baseball player (d. 2023)
- April 10 – David Angell, television producer (d. 2001)
- April 11 – Chris Burden, artist (d. 2015)
- April 12 – Ed O'Neill, actor (Married... with Children)
- April 13 – Al Green, singer, songwriter and record producer
- April 15 – Marsha Hunt, actress, singer and novelist
- April 16 – Margot Adler, journalist (d. 2014)
- April 20
  - Gordon Smiley, race car driver (d. 1982)
  - Tommy Hutton, baseball player and sportscaster
- April 22 – John Waters, film director
- April 24
  - Stafford James, bassist and composer
  - Phil Robertson, businessman and reality television personality (d. 2025)
- April 25
  - Talia Shire, actress (Rocky)
  - Strobe Talbott, journalist and diplomat
- April 26 – Richard S. Fuld Jr., banker
- April 28 – Larissa Grunig, public relations theorist, feminist
- April 30 – Bill Plympton, animator, graphic designer, cartoonist and filmmaker

=== May ===
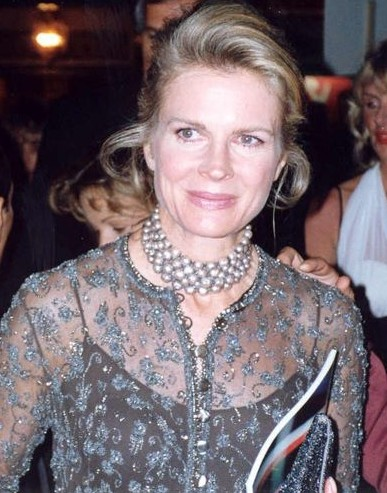
Candice Bergen

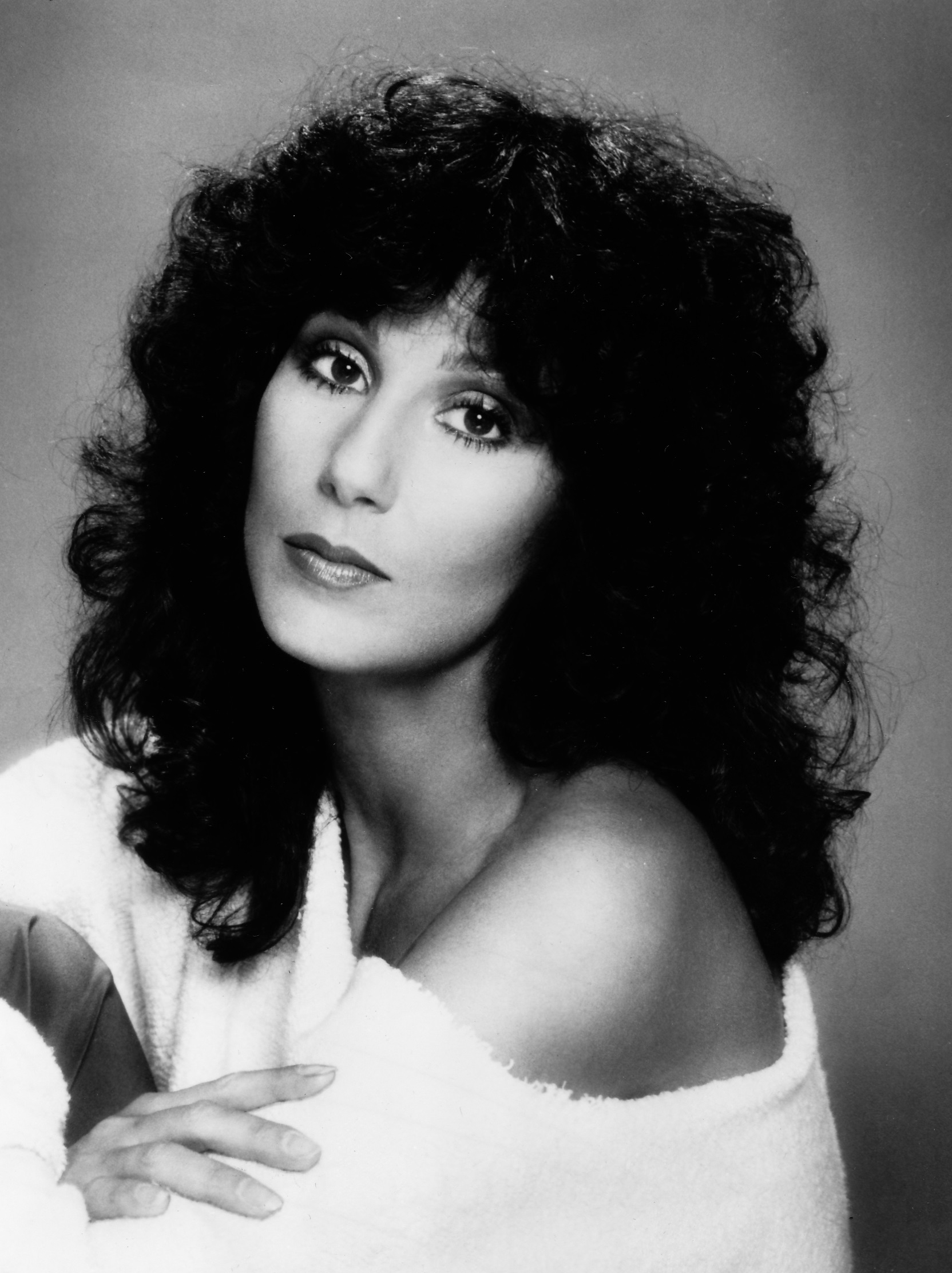
Cher

- May 2 – Lesley Gore, American rock singer ("It's My Party") (d. 2015)
- May 3
  - Greg Gumbel, American sportscaster (d. 2024)
  - Jane LaTour, American activist and journalist (d. 2023)
- May 5 – Jim Kelly, African-American actor, martial artist and tennis player (d. 2013)
- May 6
  - Larry Huber, American television producer, animator
  - Grier Jones, American golfer and coach
- May 9 – Candice Bergen, American actress (Murphy Brown)
- May 11 – Robert Jarvik, American physicist, artificial heart inventor (d. 2025)
- May 12 – Richard Bruce Silverman, American chemist
- May 14 – Claudia Goldin, American economic historian, recipient of the Nobel Memorial Prize in Economic Sciences in 2023
- May 18
  - Reggie Jackson, African-American baseball player
  - Andreas Katsulas, American actor (d. 2006)
- May 20
  - Craig Patrick, American-Canadian hockey player, coach and manager
  - Cher, American singer, songwriter and actress
- May 25 – Richard Gerald Jordan, American convicted murderer (d. 2025)

=== June ===
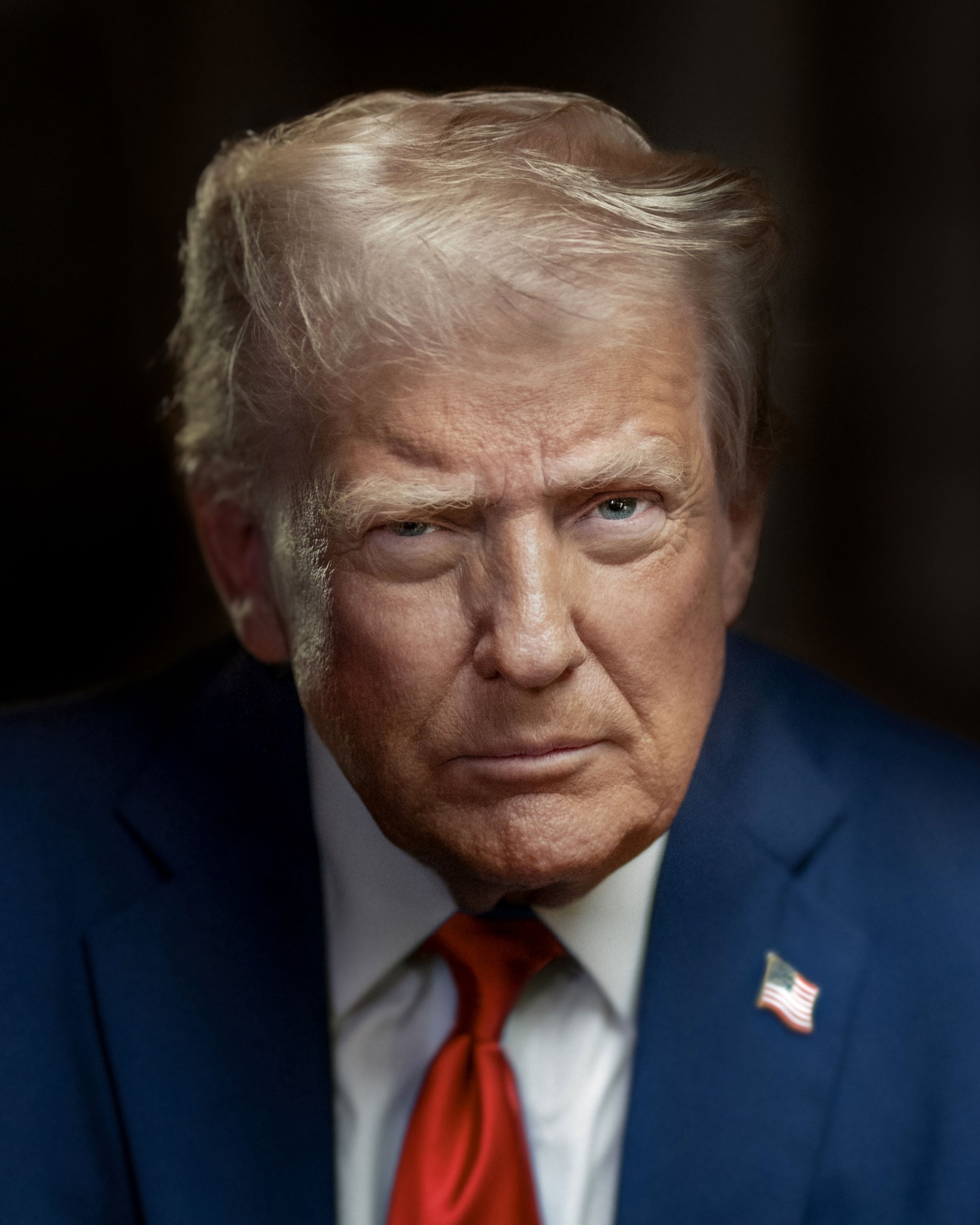
Donald Trump

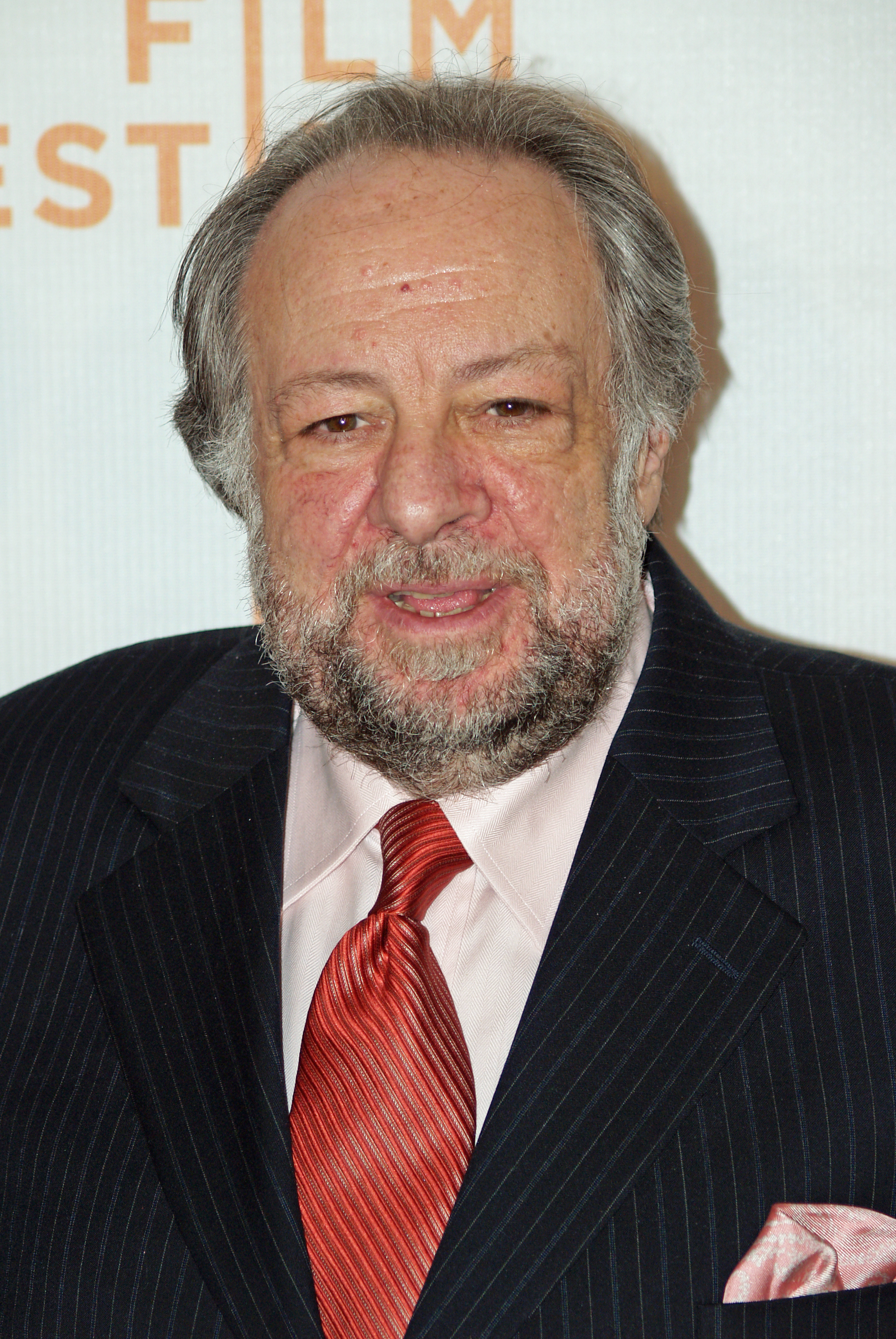
Ricky Jay

- June 3 – Michael Clarke, American drummer (d. 1993)
- June 4 – Suzanne Ciani, American pianist, electronic composer
- June 6 – Thomas DeSimone, gangster (disappeared 1979)
- June 7 – Robert Tilton, American televangelist, author
- June 13 – Paul L. Modrich, American biochemist and recipient of the Nobel Prize in Chemistry in 2015
- June 14 – Donald Trump, American businessman, television producer, politician, 45th and 47th president of the United States from 2017 to 2021 and since 2025
- June 15 – Janet Lennon, American singer (The Lennon Sisters)
- June 16 – Jodi Rell, American politician (d. 2024)
- June 17 – Marcy Kaptur, American politician
- June 18 – Bruiser Brody, American professional wrestler (d. 1988)
- June 20
  - Bob Vila, American television host
  - Joseph Waeckerle, American physician and diplomat
  - André Watts, American pianist (d. 2023)
- June 22 – Kay Redfield Jamison, American psychiatrist
- June 23 – Ted Shackelford, American actor
- June 24
  - Ellison Onizuka, American astronaut (d. 1986)
  - Robert Reich, 22nd United States Secretary of Labor
- June 26
  - Leo Rossi, American actor
  - Ricky Jay, American actor, author and magician (d. 2018)
- June 27 – Russ Critchfield, American basketball player
- June 28 – Gilda Radner, American comedian, actress (Saturday Night Live) (d. 1989)

=== July ===
George W. Bush

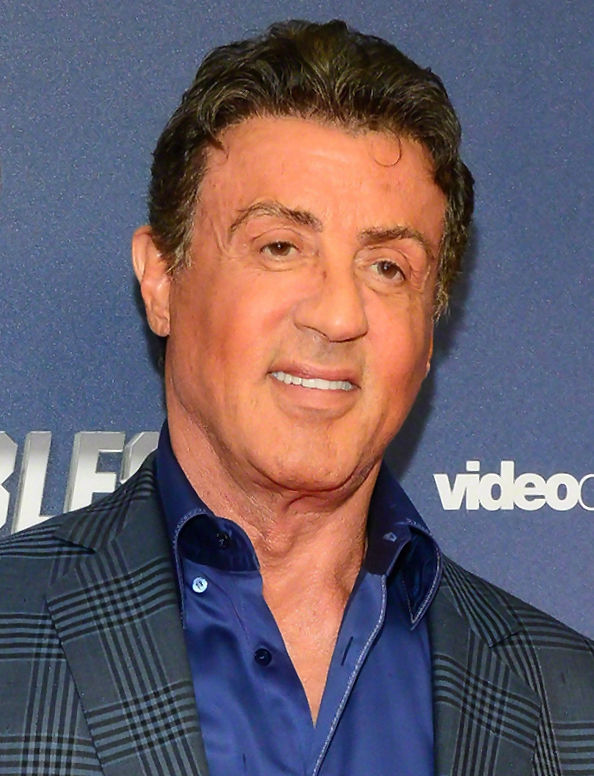
Sylvester Stallone

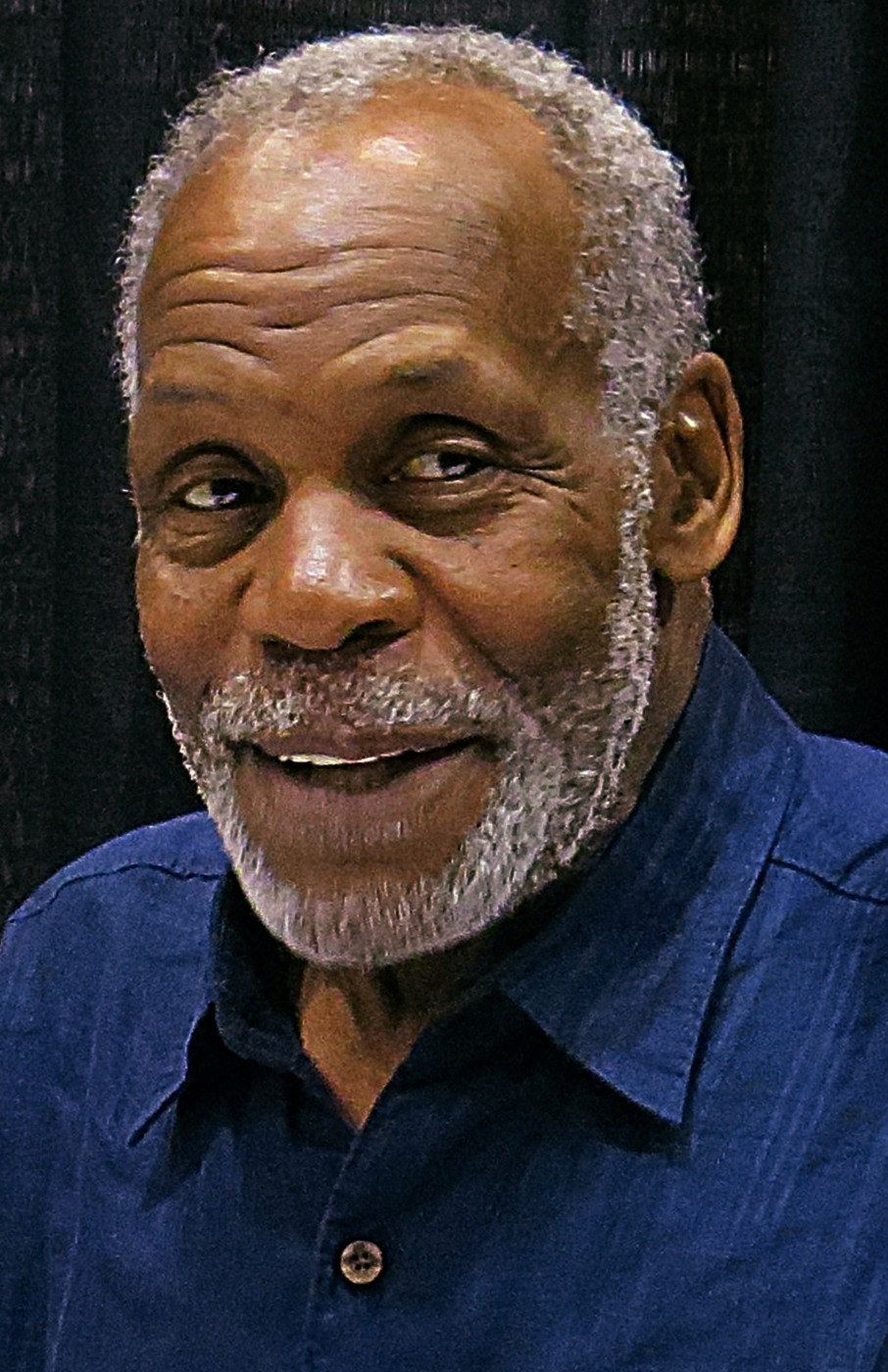
Danny Glover

- July 2 – Richard Axel, American scientist, recipient of the Nobel Prize in Physiology or Medicine
- July 4 – Michael Milken, American financier, financial criminal and philanthropist
- July 5 – Ed O'Ross, American actor
- July 6
  - George W. Bush, 43rd president of the United States from 2001 to 2009
  - Sylvester Stallone, American actor, filmmaker and screenwriter
  - Fred Dryer, American football defensive end, actor (Hunter)
  - Jamie Wyeth, American painter
- July 10
  - Sue Lyon, American actress (d. 2019)
  - Oliver Martin, American cyclist
- July 11 – Jack Wrangler, American porn star (d. 2009)
- July 13 – Cheech Marin, Mexican-American actor, comedian (Cheech and Chong)
- July 14
  - Nick Benedict, American actor and musician (d. 2023)
  - Vincent Pastore, American actor (d. 2026)
- July 15 – Linda Ronstadt, singer and songwriter
- July 16
  - Dave Goelz, puppeteer
  - Barbara Lee, politician
  - Ron Yary, American football player
- July 19
  - Suzanne de Passe, American music and screen producer
  - Roland Griffiths, American scientist (d. 2023)
- July 22
  - Jim Edgar, American politician, governor of Illinois (d. 2025)
  - Danny Glover, African-American actor, film director and political activist
- July 23
  - Sally Flynn, American singer
  - Khan Jamal, American musician (d. 2022)
- July 26 – Nancy Adler, American health psychologist (d. 2024)
- July 27
  - Larry Biittner, American baseball player (d. 2022)
  - Gwynne Gilford, American actress
- July 28 – Jonathan Edwards, American singer, songwriter and guitarist
- July 30 – Neil Bonnett, American race car driver (d. 1994)

=== August ===
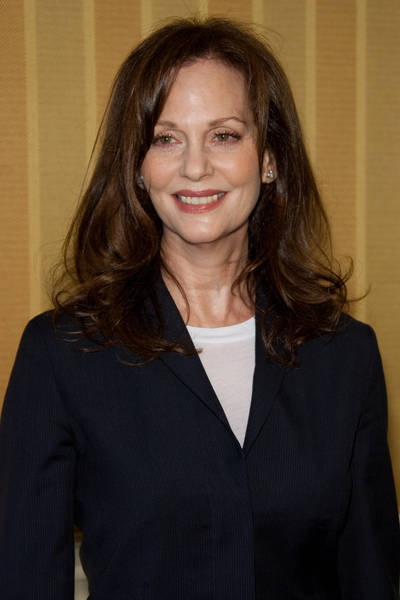
Lesley Ann Warren

Bill Clinton

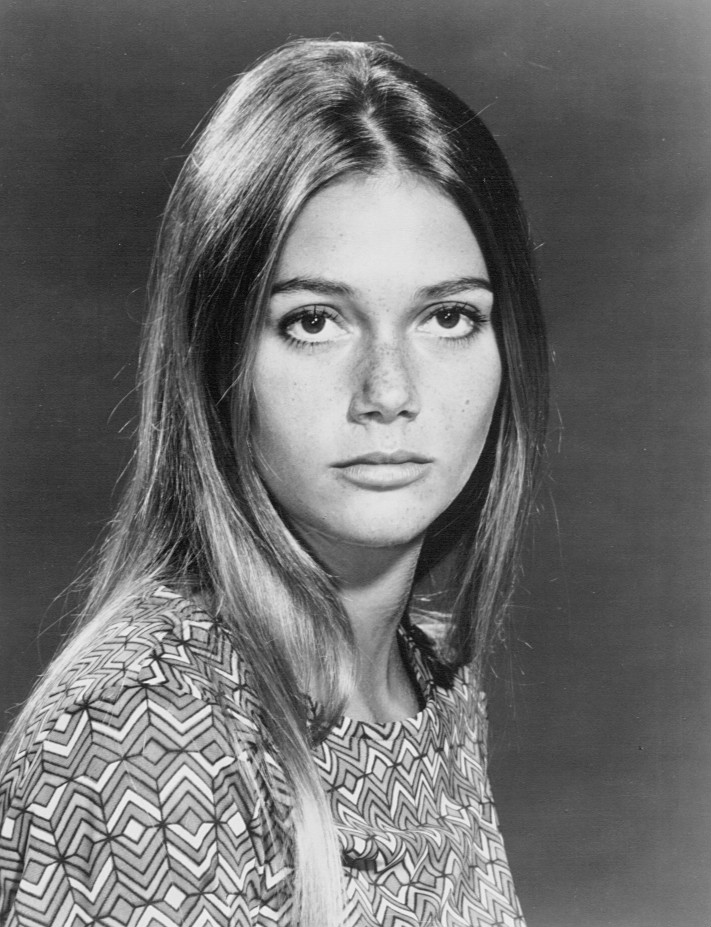
Peggy Lipton

- August 1
  - Mike Emrick, American sportscaster
  - Sandi Griffiths, American singer
- August 5
  - Ron Silliman, American poet
  - Loni Anderson, American actress (WKRP in Cincinnati) (d. 2025)
  - Shirley Ann Jackson, African American physicist and academic administrator
- August 8 – Michael Lippman, American music manager (d. 2025)
- August 9 – Jim Kiick, American football player (d. 2020)
- August 13 – Janet Yellen, American Chair of the Federal Reserve
- August 14 – Dennis Hof, American brothel owner (d. 2018)
- August 16 – Lesley Ann Warren, American actress, singer
- August 17 – Drake Levin, American rock guitarist (Paul Revere & the Raiders) (d. 2009)
- August 19
  - Charles Bolden, African-American astronaut
  - Bill Clinton, 42nd president of the United States from 1993 to 2001
- August 20 – Connie Chung, Asian-American reporter
- August 25
  - Nancy Blomberg, American art curator (d. 2018)
  - Rollie Fingers, American baseball player
  - Charles Ghigna, American poet, children's author
- August 26
  - Valerie Simpson, African-American singer
  - Mark Snow, American composer
  - Swede Savage, American race car driver (d. 1973)
- August 29 – Bob Beamon, American athlete
- August 30
  - Francis Davis, American jazz critic and author (d. 2025)
  - Peggy Lipton, American actress and model (d. 2019)
- August 31
  - Jerome Corsi, American political commentator and conspiracy theorist
  - Tom Coughlin, American football player, coach and executive

=== September ===
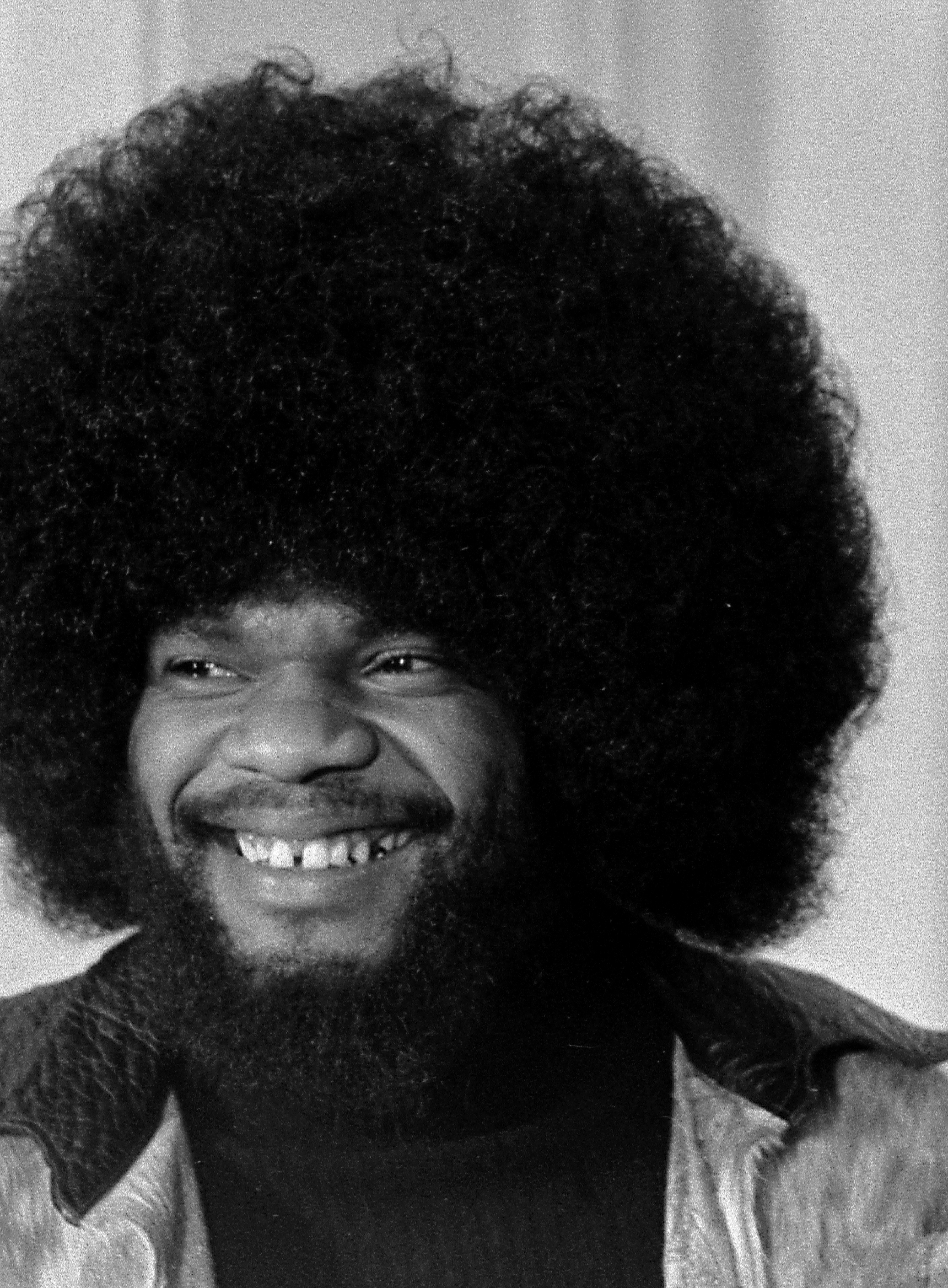
Billy Preston

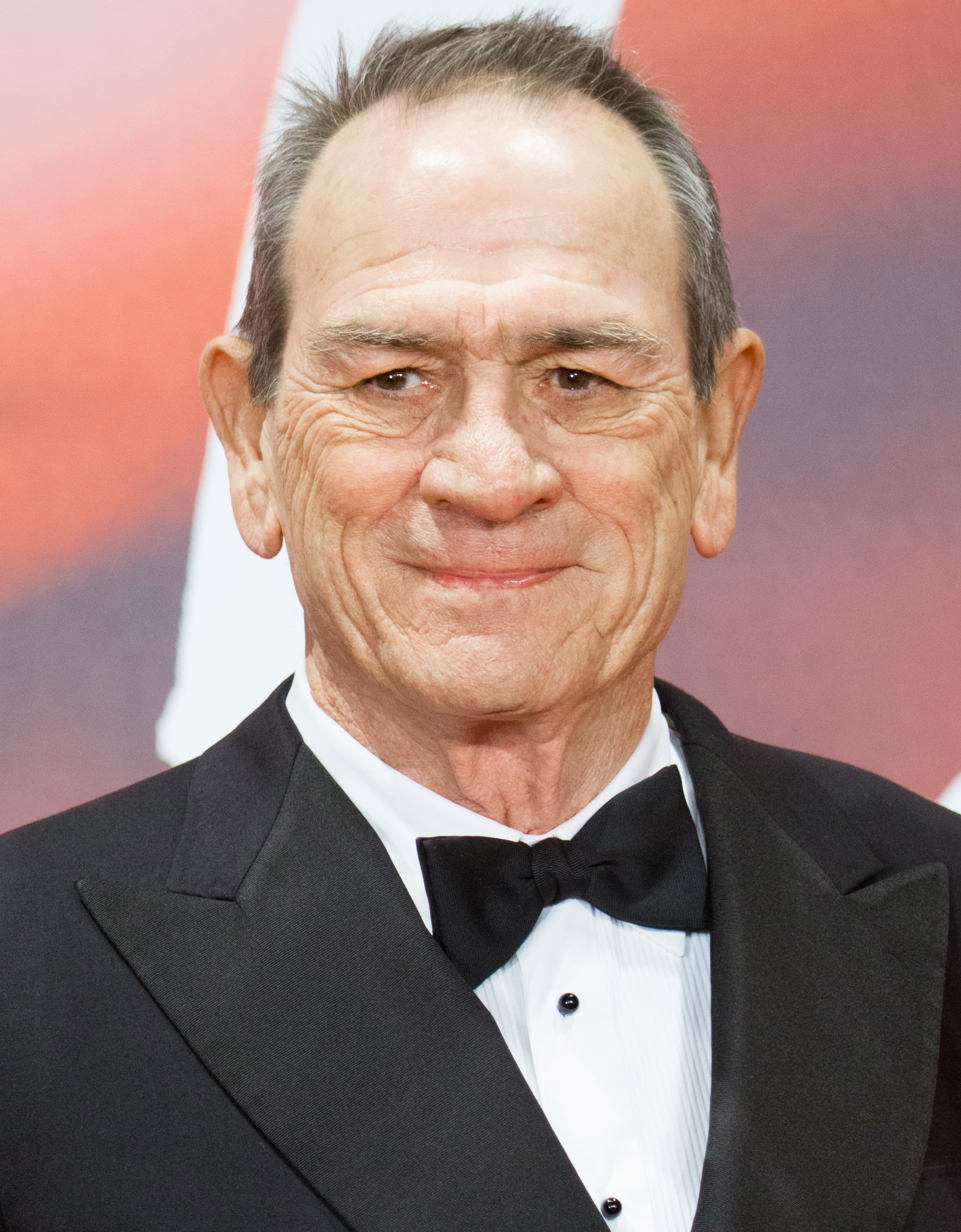
Tommy Lee Jones

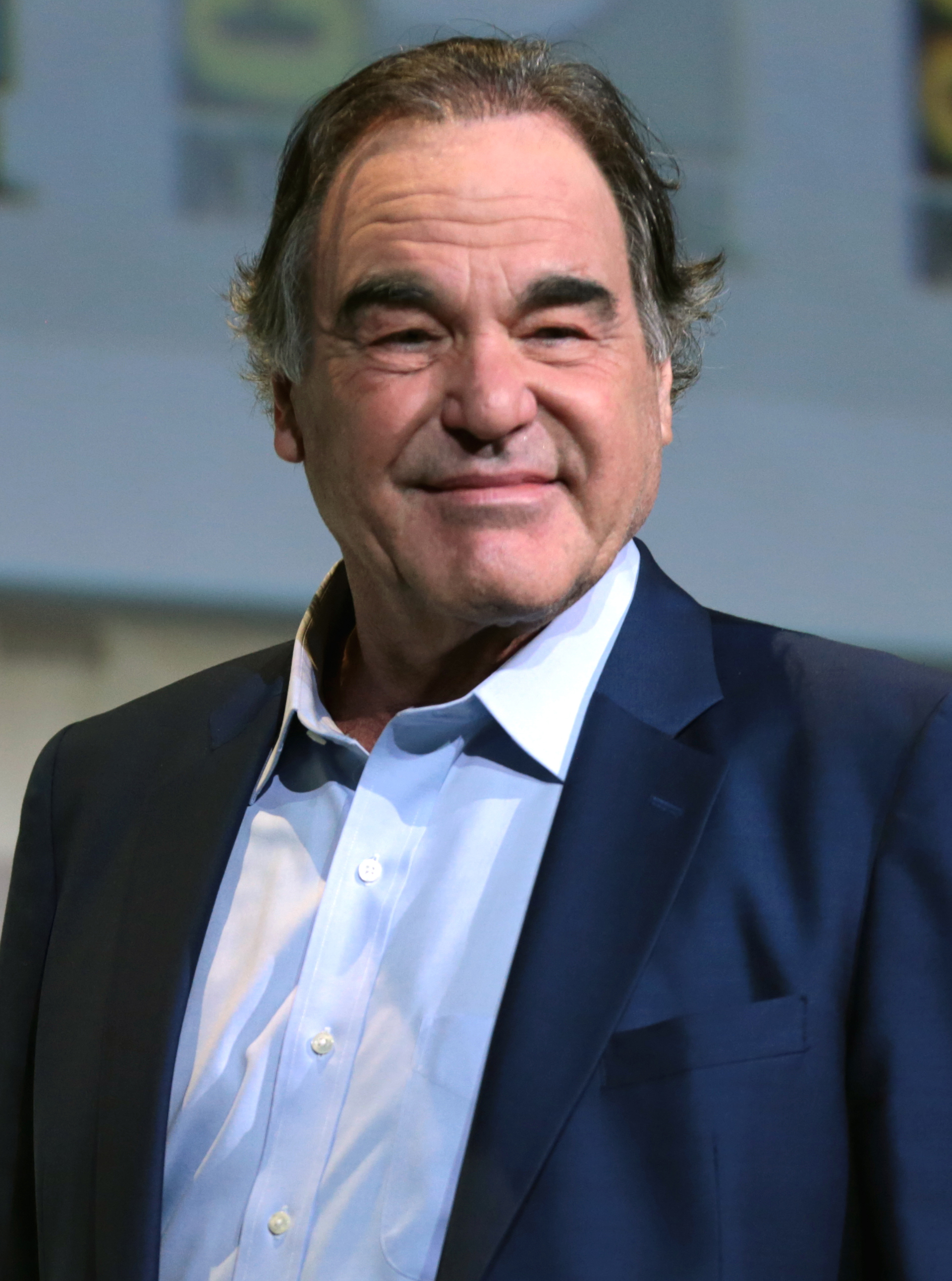
Oliver Stone

- September 2
  - Billy Preston, African-American soul musician ("Nothing from Nothing") (d. 2006)
  - Dan White, American politician, murderer (d. 1985)
- September 3
  - John N. Abrams, American general (d. 2018)
  - Thomas Anthony Durkin, American attorney (d. 2025)
- September 4
  - Gary Duncan, American rock guitarist (Quicksilver Messenger Service) (d. 2019)
  - Greg Elmore, American rock drummer (Quicksilver Messenger Service)
- September 5
  - Dennis Dugan, American actor, director
  - Loudon Wainwright III, American songwriter, folk singer, humorist and actor
- September 7 – Willie Crawford, American baseball player (d. 2004)
- September 10 – Jim Hines, African-American sprinter (d. 2023)
- September 14 – Jim Angle, American journalist and television reporter (d. 2022)
- September 15
  - Tommy Lee Jones, American actor and filmmaker
  - Oliver Stone, American film director, screenwriter, producer and veteran
- September 18
  - Peter Alsop, American musician
  - Otis Sistrunk, American football player and wrestler
- September 19 – Connie Kreski, American model (d. 1995)
- September 20
  - Jere Elliott, American alpine skier
  - Dorothy Hukill, American politician (d. 2018)
- September 21 – Richard St. Clair, American musician, composer
- September 25 – Jerry Penrod, American bass player
- September 26
  - Andrea Dworkin, American feminist, writer (d. 2005)
  - Christine Todd Whitman, American politician
- September 28 – Jeffrey Jones, American actor
- September 30 – Diego Cortez, American filmmaker and art curator (d. 2021)

=== October ===
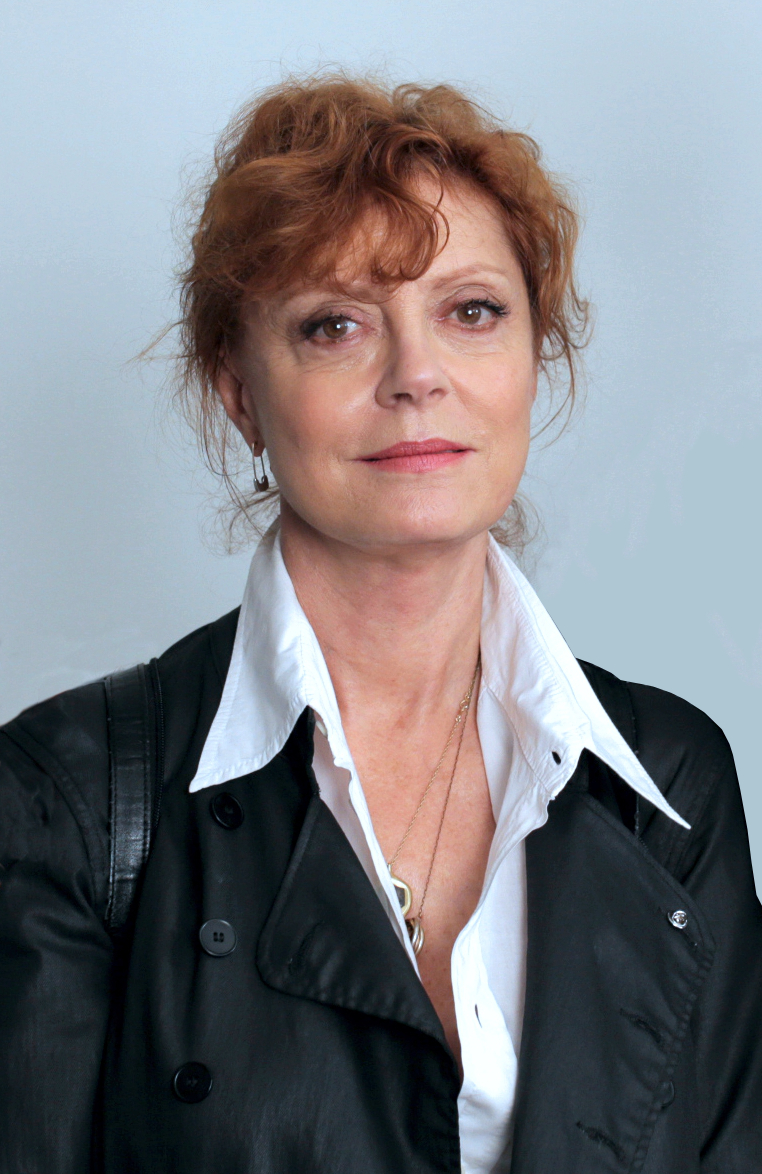
Susan Sarandon

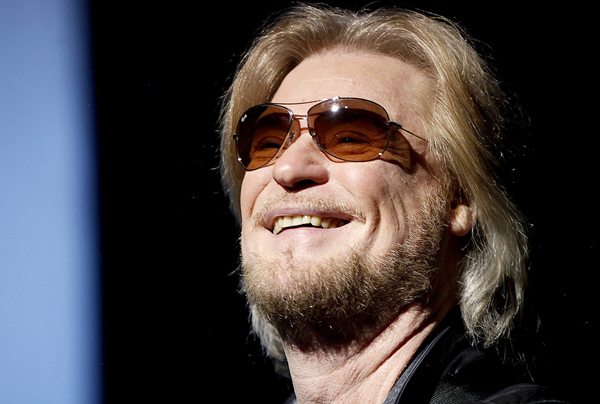
Daryl Hall

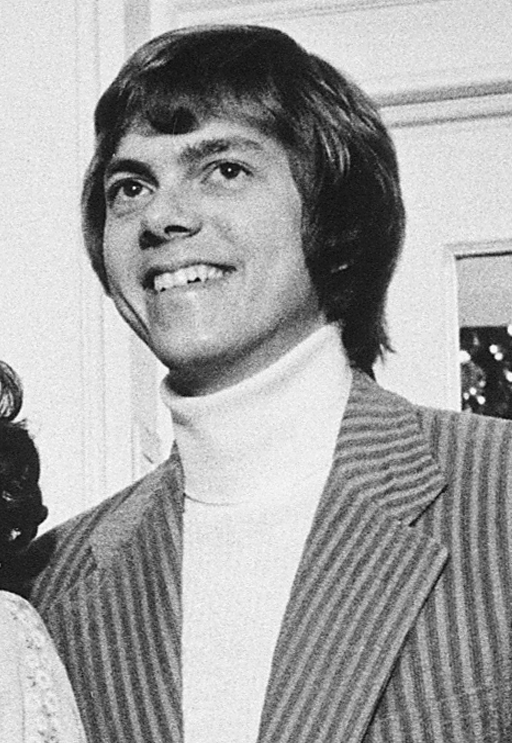
Richard Carpenter

- October 1 – Tim O'Brien, author
- October 3
  - P. P. Arnold, singer
  - Melinda Ledbetter, talent manager (d. 2024)
- October 4
  - Chuck Hagel, politician, 24th United States Secretary of Defense
  - Susan Sarandon, actress (Thelma & Louise)
- October 5 – Heather MacRae, actress
- October 6
  - Gene Clines, baseball player and coach (d. 2022)
  - Lloyd Doggett, politician
- October 7 – Catharine A. MacKinnon, feminist
- October 8 – John T. Walton, son of Wal-Mart founder Sam Walton (d. 2005)
- October 10 – John Prine, country folk singer (d. 2020)
- October 11 – Daryl Hall, rock musician (Hall & Oates)
- October 12 – Drew Edmondson, politician
- October 13
  - Dorothy Moore, singer
  - Demond Wilson, African-American actor, minister (Sanford and Son)
- October 14 – Craig Venter, biotechnologist
- October 15
  - Richard Carpenter, American pop musician, composer (The Carpenters)
  - John Getz, American actor
- October 16 – Suzanne Somers, American actress, singer (Three's Company) (d. 2023)
- October 17 – Bob Seagren, American athlete, actor
- October 23 – Mel Martínez, American politician
- October 25 – Miss Major Griffin-Gracy, transgender rights activist (d. 2025)
- October 26 – Pat Sajak, American game-show host (Wheel of Fortune)
- October 29 – Kathryn J. Whitmire, Texas politician, mayor of Houston
- October 30
  - Lynne Marta, American actress (d. 2024)
  - Andrea Mitchell, American journalist

=== November ===
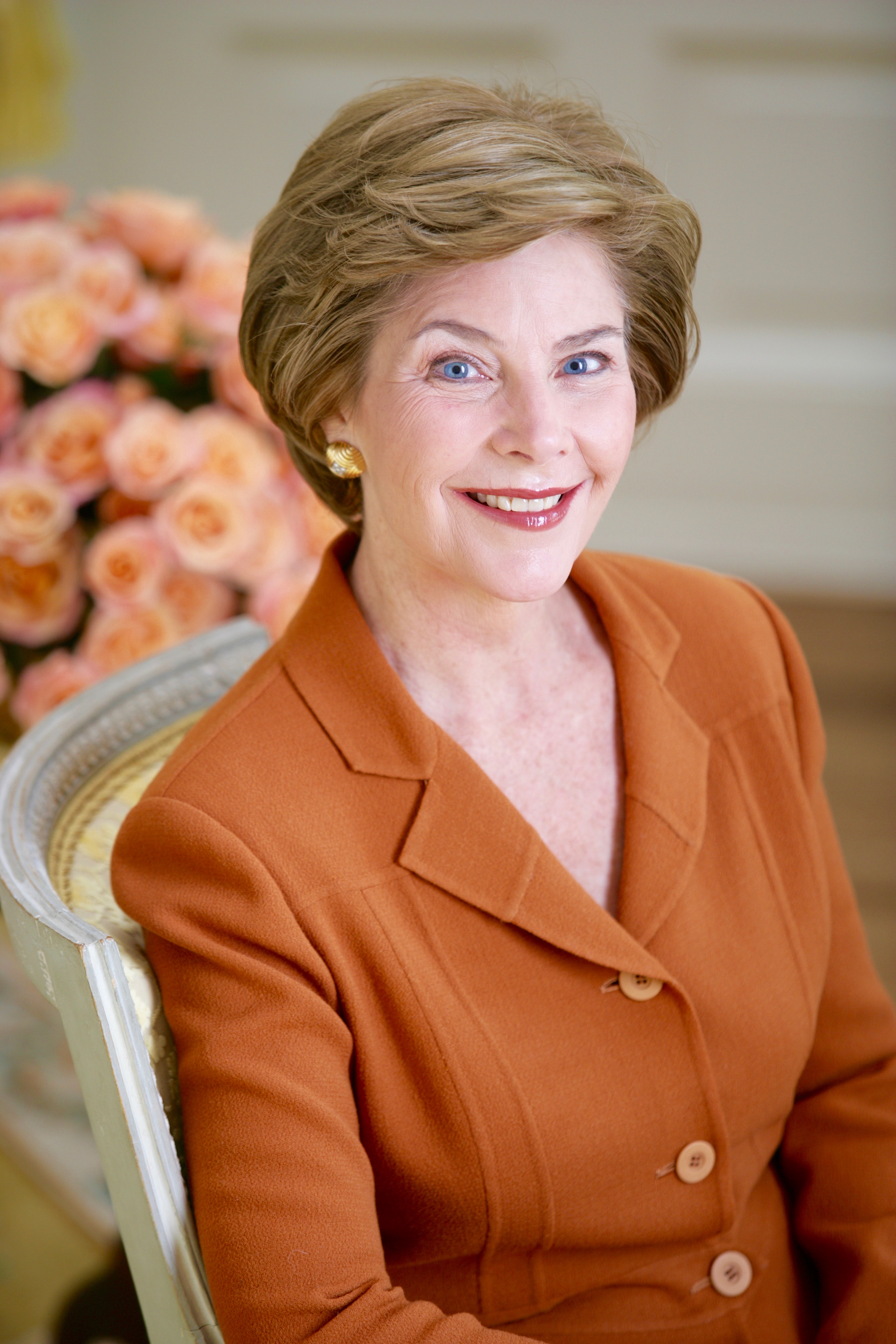
Laura Bush

Sally Field

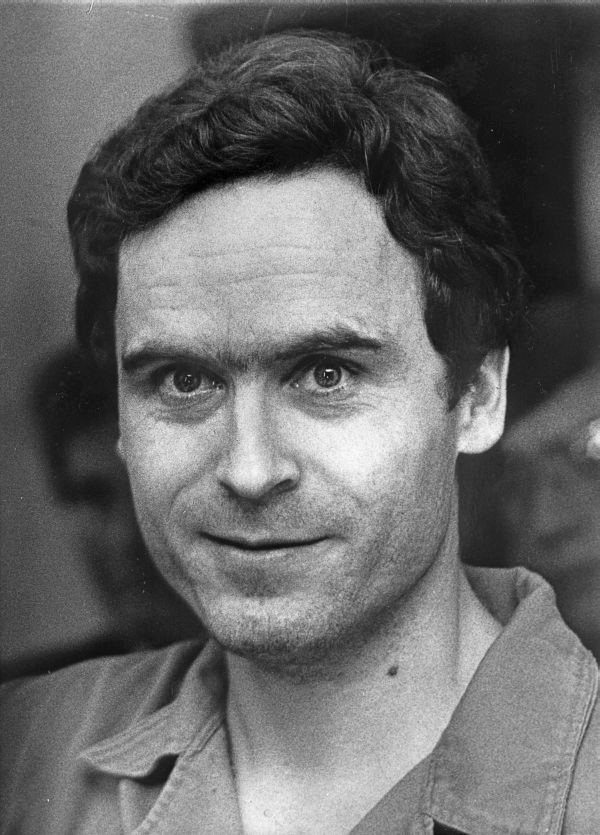
Ted Bundy

- November 1 – Lynne Russell, American newsreader
- November 4
  - Laura Bush, former First Lady of the United States
  - Les Lannom, American actor, musician
  - Robert Mapplethorpe, American photographer (d. 1989)
- November 5
  - Loleatta Holloway, American singer (d. 2011)
  - Gram Parsons, American musician (d. 1973)
- November 6 – Sally Field, American actress, singer (The Flying Nun)
- November 7 – Chrystos, American poet
- November 10 – Alaina Reed Hall, American actress (d. 2009)
- November 11
  - Corrine Brown, American politician, fraudster
  - Sandy Skoglund, American photographer
- November 14 – Sacheen Littlefeather, American actress, model and activist for Native American civil rights (d. 2022)
- November 16
  - Barbara Leigh, American fashion model and film actress in the 1970s
  - Terence McKenna, American writer, philosopher, ethnobotanist and shaman (d. 2000)
  - Jo Jo White, American basketball player (d. 2018)
- November 17 – Terry Branstad, American politician
- November 18 – Alan Dean Foster, American novelist
- November 20
  - J. Blackfoot, American singer (The Soul Children) (d. 2011)
  - Greg Cook, American football player (d, 2012)
  - Judy Woodruff, American television reporter
  - Duane Allman, American rock guitarist, co-founder and leader of the Allman Brothers Band (d. 1971)
  - Samuel E. Wright, American actor and singer (d. 2021)
- November 23 – Bobby Rush, African-American politician, activist and pastor
- November 24
  - Ted Bundy, American serial killer (d. 1989)
  - Jimmy Collins, American basketball player and coach (d. 2020)
- November 25
  - Marc Brown, American author of children's books.
- November 27 – Richard Codey, American politician, 53rd Governor of New Jersey
- November 29 – Suzy Chaffee, American singer, actress
- November 30 – Barbara Cubin, U.S. Congresswoman from Wyoming

=== December ===
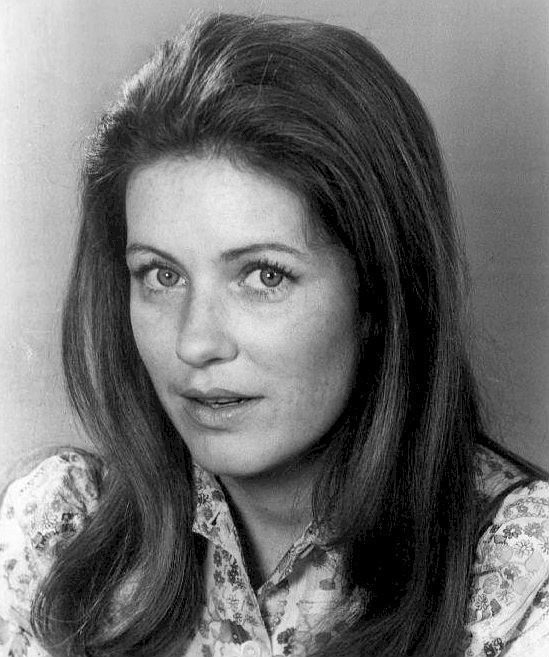
Patty Duke

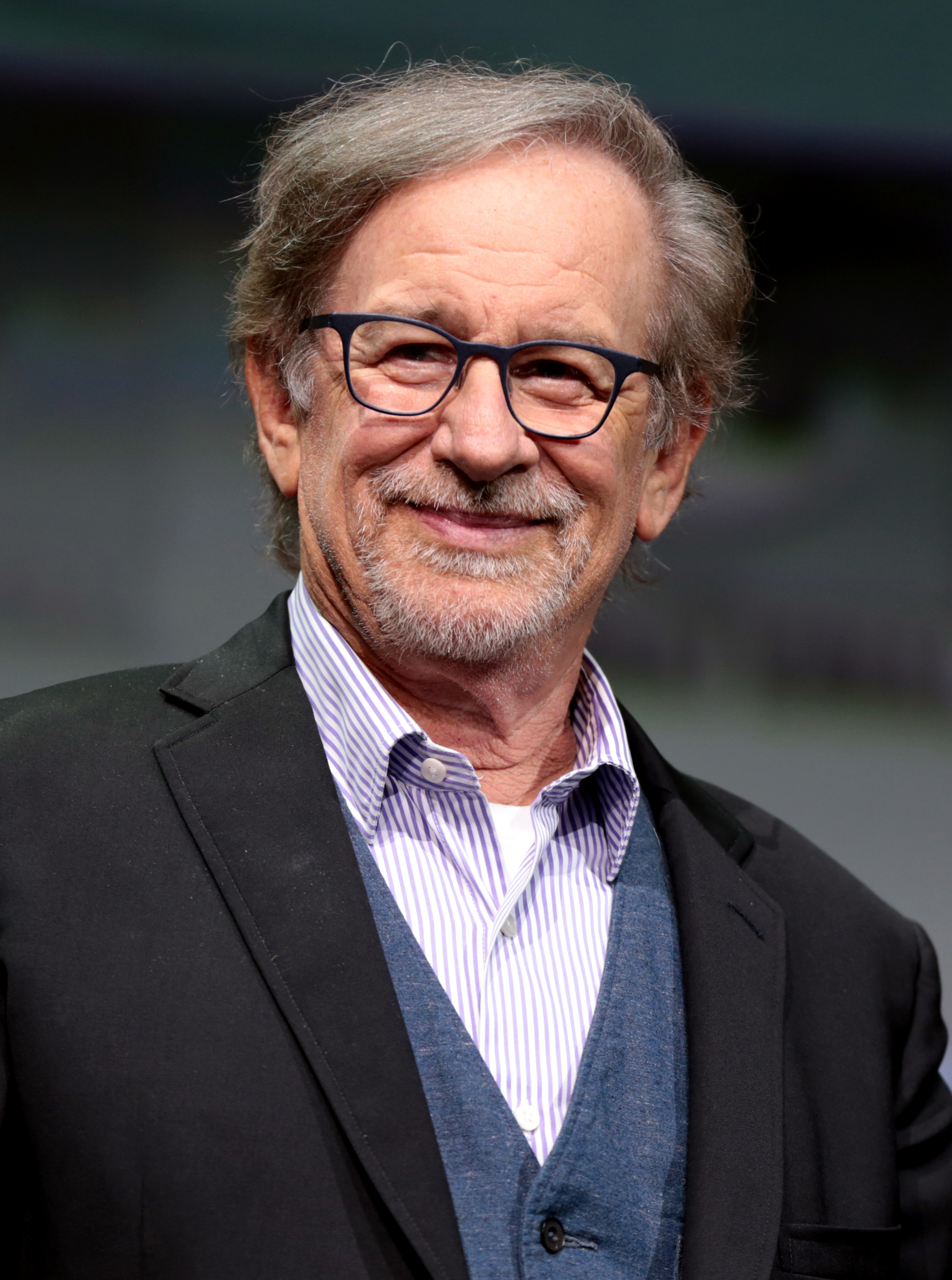
Steven Spielberg

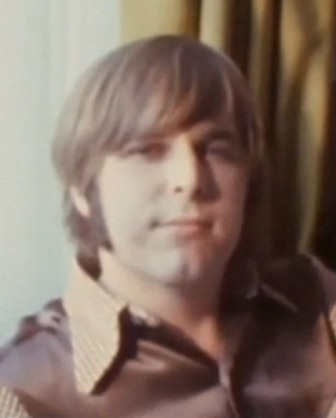
Carl Wilson

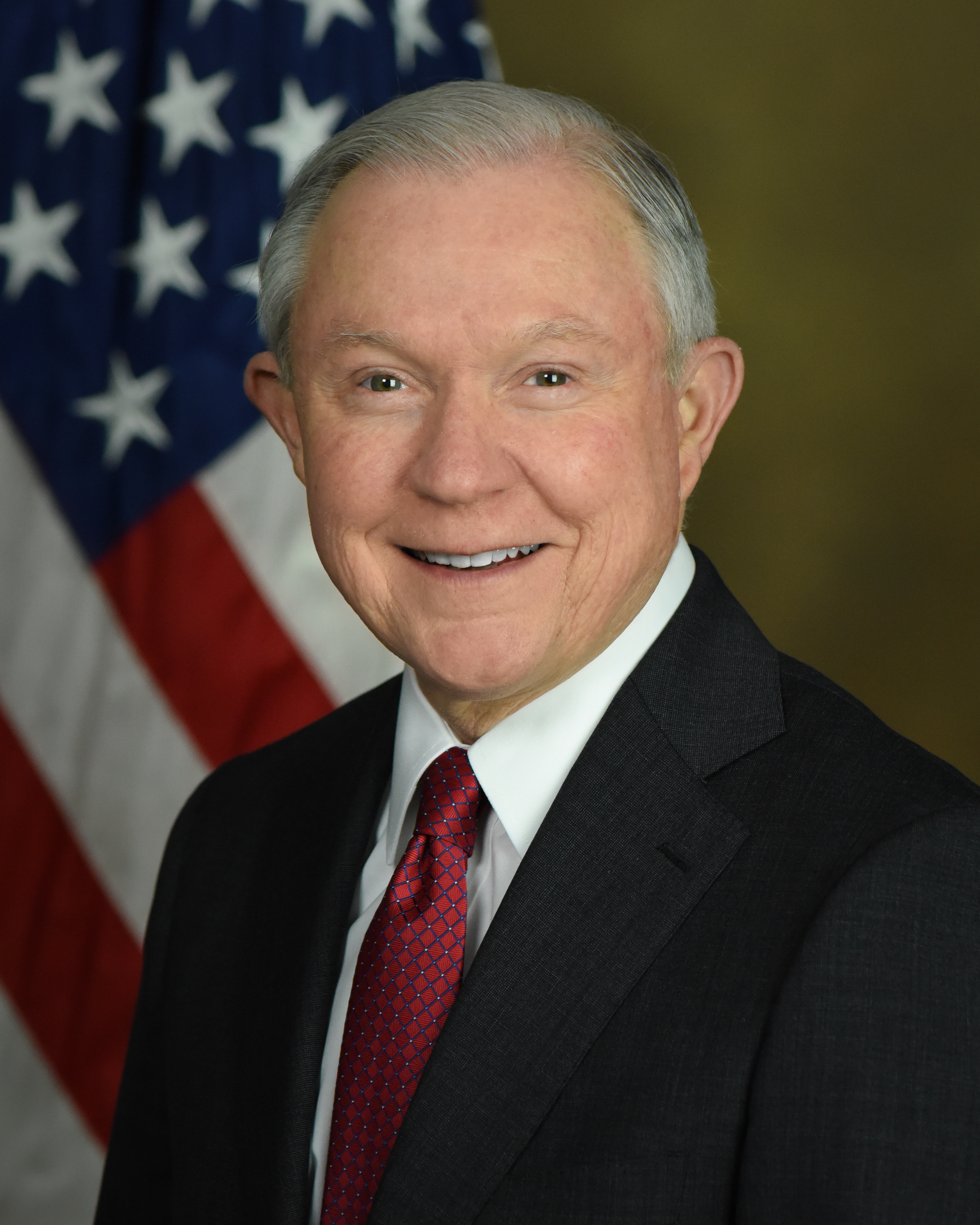
Jeff Sessions

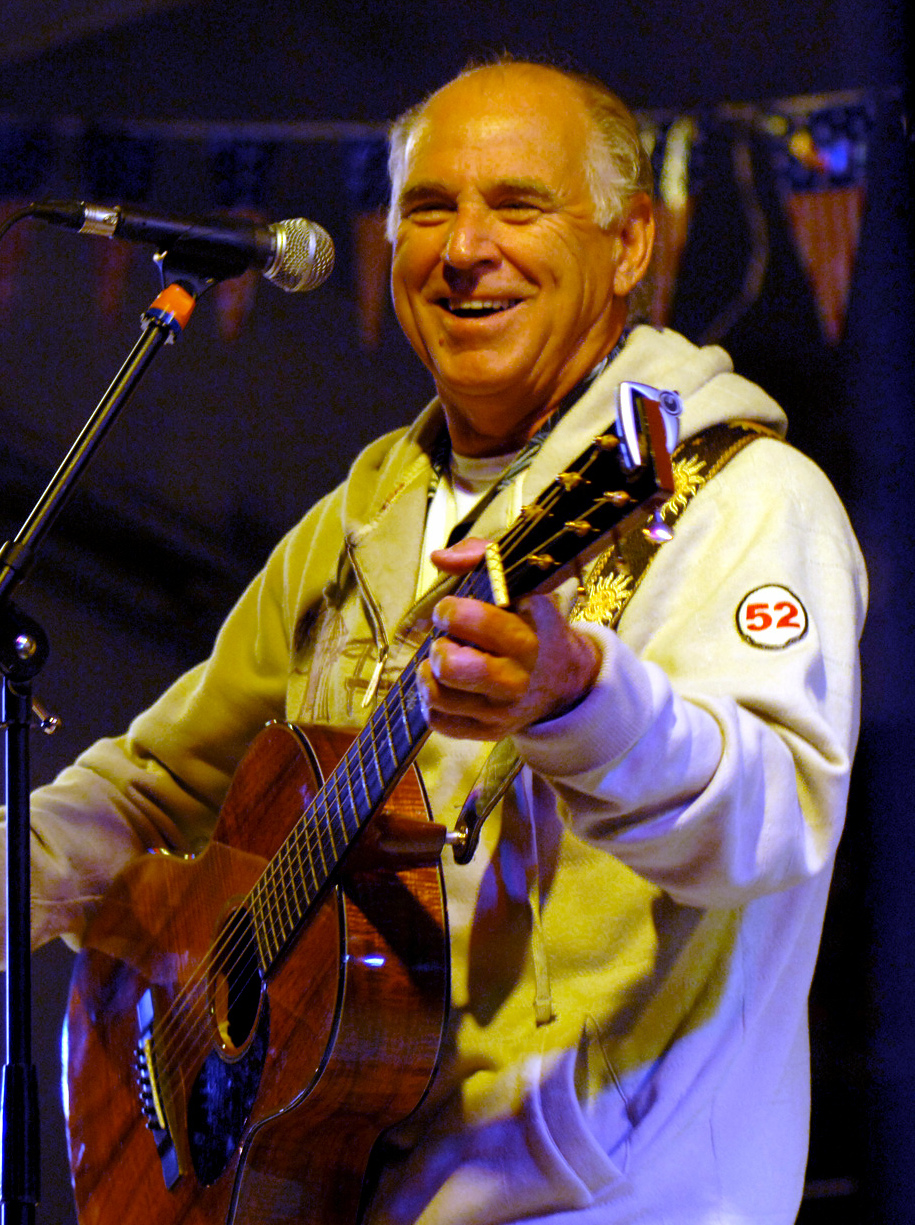
Jimmy Buffett

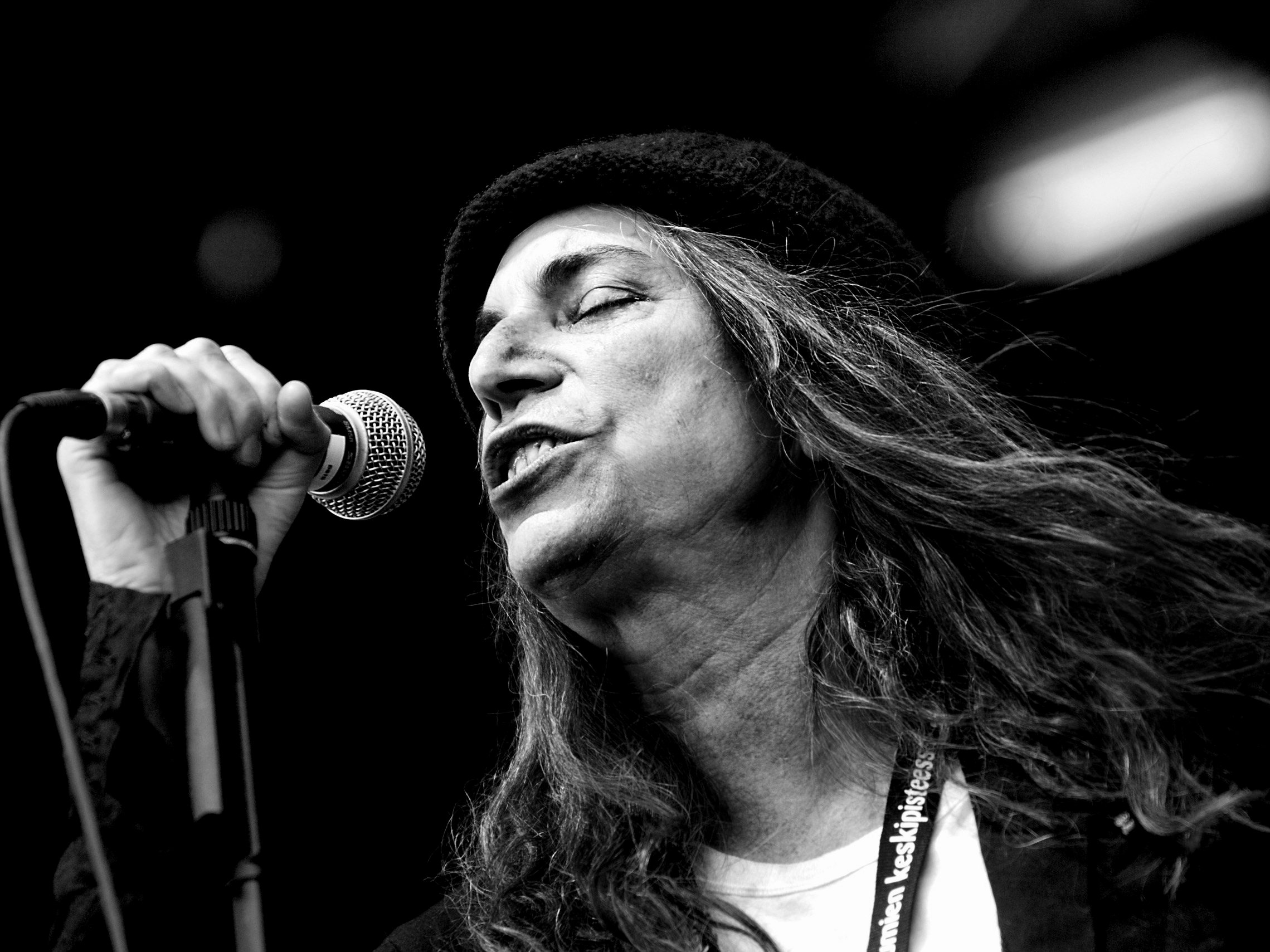
Patti Smith

- December 1
  - Jonathan Katz, American comedian and actor
  - Jimmy McMillan, American founder of the Rent Is Too Damn High Party, political activist, perennial candidate
- December 4 – Sherry Alberoni, American actress, voice artist
- December 6
  - Frankie Beverly, American soul singer-songwriter and producer (d. 2024)
  - Nancy Brinker, American health activist, diplomat
- December 8 – John Rubinstein, American actor, director and composer
- December 9 – Dennis Dunaway, American bassist and composer
- December 10 – Thomas Lux, American poet and academic (d. 2017)
- December 11
  - Susan Kyle, American writer
  - Ellen Meloy, American writer (d. 2004)
- December 12
  - Josepha Sherman, American author, folklorist and anthropologist (d. 2012)
  - Paula Wagner, American film producer and executive
  - Gloria Loring, American singer
  - Don Gummer, American sculptor
- December 13 – Heather North, American television, voice actress (d. 2017)
- December 14
  - Patty Duke, American actress (d. 2016)
  - Lynne Marie Stewart, American actress (d. 2025)
- December 16 – Alice Aycock, American sculptor
- December 18 – Steven Spielberg, American film director, screenwriter, producer and executive
- December 19
  - Candace Pert, American neuroscientist (d. 2013)
  - Robert Urich, American actor (Vega$) (d. 2002)
- December 20
  - John Spencer, American actor (d. 2005)
  - Lloyd Mumphord, American football player
  - Sonny Perdue, politician, 81st Governor of Georgia
  - Dick Wolf, American television producer
- December 21 – Carl Wilson, American musician (The Beach Boys) (d. 1998)
- December 23 – Susan Lucci, American actress (General Hospital)
- December 24
  - Brenda Howard, American bisexual activist (d. 2005)
  - Jeff Sessions, American politician, United States Attorney General
- December 25
  - Jimmy Buffett, American rock singer, songwriter ("Margaritaville") (d. 2023)
  - Larry Csonka, American football player
  - Gene Lamont, American baseball player, manager
- December 27 – Lenny Kaye, American guitarist
- December 28
  - Mike Beebe, American politician, attorney
  - Tim Johnson, American politician (d. 2024)
  - Edgar Winter, American rock musician ("Frankenstein")
- December 29
  - Jackie Bezos, American businesswoman and philanthropist (d. 2025)
  - Paul S. Trible, Jr., American politician
- December 30 – Patti Smith, American poet, singer

=== Date unknown ===
- Tyler Burge, philosopher

== Deaths ==
=== January ===
- January 3 – William Joyce, Nazi propaganda broadcaster (executed) (born 1906)
- January 5 – Kitty Cheatham, singer (born 1864)
- January 6 – Slim Summerville, actor (born 1892)
- January 9 – Countee Cullen, African American poet (born 1903)
- January 10 – Harry Von Tilzer, songwriter (born 1872)
- January 21 – Priscilla Hussey, American entomologist and biology professor (born 1894)
- January 29
  - Harry Hopkins, politician (born 1890)
  - Adriaan van Maanen, astronomer (born 1884 in the Netherlands)

=== February ===
- February 2 – Rondo Hatton, film character actor (born 1894)
- February 15
  - Putney Dandridge, African American jazz musician (born 1902)
  - Cornelius Johnson, athlete (born 1913)
- February 17 – Dorothy Gibson, silent film actress and model (born 1889)
- February 21 – Theodore Stark Wilkinson, admiral (born 1888)
- February 22 – Bud Geary, actor (born 1898)

=== March ===
- March 2 – George E. Stewart, Medal of Honor recipient (born 1872)
- March 3 – Pauline Whittier, golfer (born 1876)
- March 23 – Gilbert N. Lewis, chemist (born 1875)

=== April ===
- April 1
  - Noah Beery Sr., actor (born 1882)
  - Edward Sheldon, playwright (born 1886)
- April 2 – Kate Bruce, silent film actress (born 1858)
- April 5 – Vincent Youmans, Broadway composer (born 1898)
- April 14 – Otto Dowling, Captain (USN) and 25th Governor of American Samoa (born 1881)
- April 20 – Mae Busch, film actress (born 1891)
- April 22 – Harlan F. Stone, Chief Justice of the United States (born 1872)

=== May ===
- May 1 – Bill Johnston, tennis player (born 1894)
- May 2 – Simon Flexner, pathologist and bacteriologist (born 1863)
- May 19 – Booth Tarkington, novelist (born 1869)
- May 23 – Billy Sullivan, actor (born 1891)
- May 25 – Patty Hill, nursery teacher and co-composer of "Happy Birthday to You" (born 1868)

=== June ===
- June 2 – Carrie Ingalls, younger sister of author Laura Ingalls Wilder (born 1870)
- June 10 – Jack Johnson, African American heavyweight boxer (born 1878)
- June 13 – Edward Bowes, radio personality (born 1874)
- June 14 – Charles Butterworth, comic actor (born 1896)
- June 23 – William S. Hart, stage actor and silent film cowboy star (born 1864/1865)
- June 27 – Wanda Gág, artist, author, translator and illustrator (born 1893)
- June 28 – Antoinette Perry, actress and director (born 1888)
- June 30 – Howard Hyde Russell, founder of the Anti-Saloon League (born 1855)

=== July ===
- July 2 – Mary Alden, stage and screen actress (born 1883)
- July 4 – Evelyn Francis Snow, politician
- July 8 – Orrick Glenday Johns, poet and playwright (born 1887)
- July 12 – Ray Stannard Baker, journalist and author (born 1870)
- July 13 – Alfred Stieglitz, photographer (born 1864)
- July 14 – Riley Puckett, country musician (born 1894)
- July 20 – Tricky Sam Nanton, trombonist (born 1904)
- July 27 – Gertrude Stein, writer (born 1874)

=== August ===
- August 6 – Tony Lazzeri, baseball player (New York Yankees) (born 1903)
- August 26 – Jeanie MacPherson, film actress and screenwriter (born 1887)
- August 28 – Florence Turner, film actress (born 1885)
- August 29 – John Steuart Curry, painter (born 1897)
- August 30 – Theodate Pope Riddle, architect and philanthropist (born 1867)

=== September ===
- September 16 – Mamie Smith, African American vaudeville performer and blues singer (born 1883)
- September 17 – Frank Burke, baseball player (born 1880)
- September 21 – Lydia J. Newcomb Comings, American educator (born 1850)
- September 23 – Rosa Lee Tucker, librarian (born 1866)
- September 26 – William Strunk, Jr., professor of English (born 1869)

=== October ===
- October 4 – Barney Oldfield, race car driver and automobile pioneer (born 1878)
- October 9 – Enrica Clay Dillon, opera singer (born 1881)
- October 12 – Joseph Stilwell, general (born 1883)

=== November ===
- November 5 – Joseph Stella, Futurist painter (born 1877 in Italy)
- November 7 – Henry Lehrman, film director (born 1886 in Austria)
- November 23 – Arthur Dove, abstract painter (born 1880)
- November 25 – George Gandy, entrepreneur (born 1851)

=== December ===
- December 7 – Laurette Taylor, stage and silent film actress (born 1884)
- December 10
  - Walter Johnson, baseball player (Washington Senators) (born 1887)
  - Damon Runyon, short-story writer (born 1880)
- December 13 – Curtis Hidden Page, New Hampshire politician (born 1870)
- December 14 – Tom Dowse, baseball player (born 1866 in Ireland)
- December 16 – Zachary Taylor Davis, Chicago architect (born 1872)
- December 23 – John A. Sampson, gynecologist (born 1873)
- December 25 – W. C. Fields, comic actor (born 1880)
- December 28
  - Carrie Jacobs-Bond, singer-songwriter (born 1862)
  - Elie Nadelman, sculptor (born 1882 in Poland)

== See also ==
- List of American films of 1946
- Timeline of United States history (1930–1949)
