= Oliver Martin (cyclist) =

American cyclist

Personal information
- Full name: Oliver Martin, Jr
- Nickname: Butch
- Born: July 10, 1946 (age 80) New York, New York, United States
- Height: 180 cm (5 ft 11 in)
- Weight: 70 kg (154 lb)

Cycling career
- Sport: Cycling

Oliver Martin (born July 10, 1946) is a former American cyclist. He competed at the 1964 Summer Olympics and the 1968 Summer Olympics.
