= Jere Elliott =

American alpine skier (born 1946)

Jere Elliott (born September 20, 1946 in Steamboat Springs, Colorado) is an American former alpine skier who competed in the 1968 Winter Olympics.
