= Proclamation 2714 =

Legal end of hostilities in World War II

Presidential Proclamation 2714 (61 Stat. 1048) was signed by President Harry S. Truman on December 31, 1946, to officially declare the cessation of all hostilities in World War II.

Even though the actual combat of the war ended May 8, 1945, in Europe and September 2, 1945, in the Pacific, the state of war was not lifted off of Japan and Germany in order to give a reason for the necessity of occupation troops in these countries. Once the War Crime Trials were over, the hostilities were seen as over.

== Legal Effects ==
The signing of Proclamation 2714 is the legal basis for the end of World War II. As a result, any person who served between December 7, 1941, and December 31, 1946, is considered a World War II veteran. Furthermore, the signing of the proclamation coincided with the termination of wartime statutes. In 1976, President Gerald Ford signed Proclamation 4417 which declared that Proclamation 2714 voided the justification for Executive Order 9066 and thus made it inoperable.

== Text ==
The Text of the Proclamation is as follows:

Cessation of Hostilities of World War II

With God's help this nation and our allies, through sacrifice and devotion, courage and perseverance, wrung final and unconditional surrender from our enemies. Thereafter, we, together with the other United Nations, set about building a world in which justice shall replace force. With spirit, through faith, with a determination that there shall be no more wars of aggression calculated to enslave the peoples of the world and destroy their civilization, and with the guidance of Almighty Providence great gains have been made in translating military victory into permanent peace. Although a state of war still exists, it is at this time possible to declare, and I find it to be in the public interest to declare, that hostilities have terminated.

NOW THEREFORE, I, HARRY S. TRUMAN, President of the United States of America, do hereby proclaim the cessation of hostilities of World War II, effective twelve o'clock noon, December 31, 1946.

IN WITNESS WHEREOF, I have hereunto set my hand and caused the seal of the United States of America to be affixed.

DONE at the City of Washington this 31st day of December in the year of our Lord nineteen hundred and forty-six, and of the Independence of the United States of America the one hundred and seventy-first. [SEAL]

HARRY S. TRUMAN

By the President:

JAMES F. BYRNES,

The Secretary of State.
