= Bob Boetticher =

American funeral director

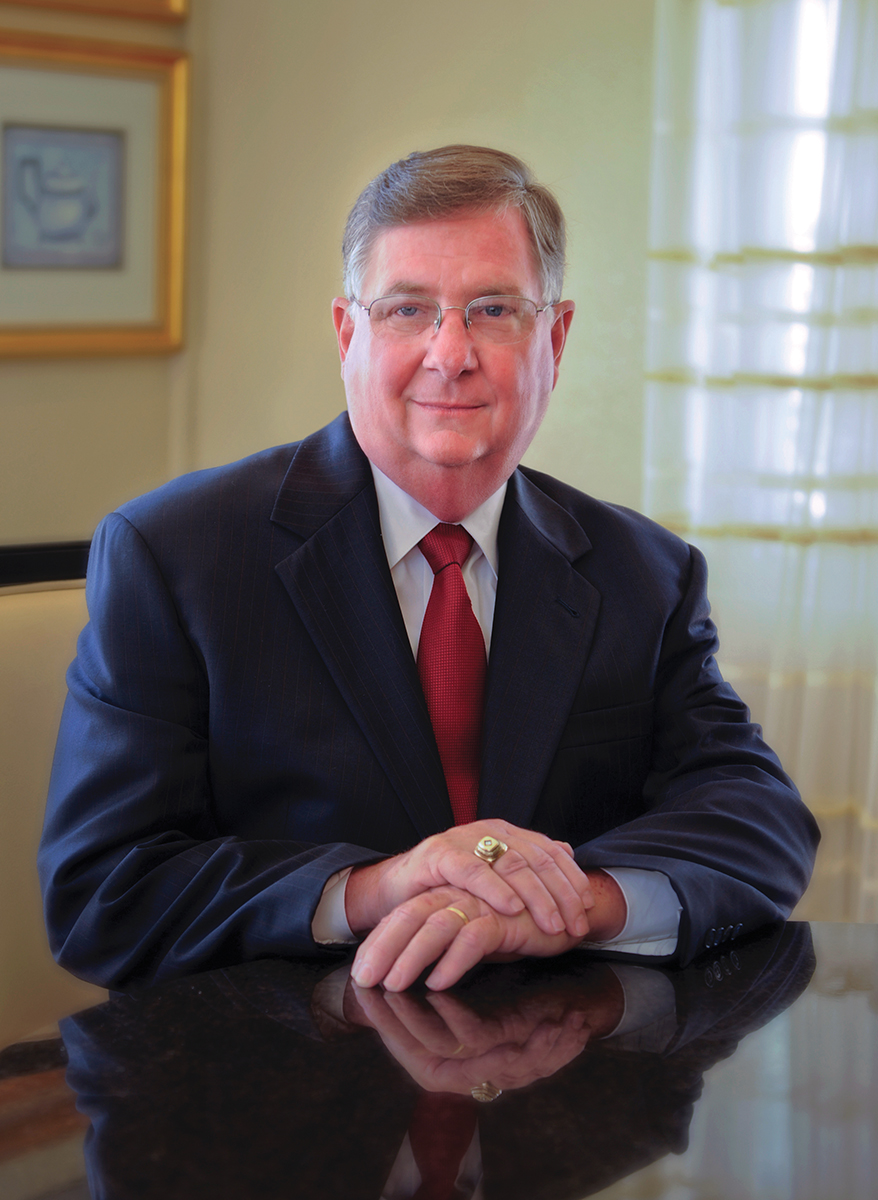
- Boetticher in 2011
- Born: Robert Michael Boetticher; August 23, 1946 (age 80); Santa Monica, California, U.S.
- Education: Army and Navy Academy; California College of Mortuary Science (now Cypress College)
- Occupation: Funeral director
- Years active: 1965–present
- Employer: Service Corporation International
- Known for: State funerals of George H. W. Bush, Gerald Ford, Ronald Reagan, and Jimmy Carter

Robert Michael Boetticher Sr. (born August 23, 1946) is an American funeral director, best known for the planning and implementation of memorial services for celebrities and notable individuals. A renowned figure in the death care industry, he was the lead funeral director for the state funerals of George H. W. Bush, Gerald Ford, Ronald Reagan, and Jimmy Carter.

== Early life and education ==
Boetticher was born in Santa Monica, California to Henry Edward Boetticher,(1924 – 2004), an entrepreneur, and Patricia Jean Boetticher (1923 - 2011), a homemaker and community volunteer. Boetticher and his older brother, William Edward (1944 - ), were raised in Brentwood, a suburb of Los Angeles.

Boetticher knew from an early age that he wanted to pursue a career in funeral service. He graduated high school from Army and Navy Academy in Carlsbad, California in 1965, then later enrolled at the California College of Mortuary Science to become a licensed embalmer and funeral director.

== Military service ==
During the Vietnam War, Boetticher was drafted by the U.S. Army and was forced to leave his studies at the mortuary college as well as positions with a local funeral home Armstrong Family Mortuary and Goodhew Ambulance Company in Los Angeles, California. He was sent to Fort Polk, Louisiana for Basic Training and then made the decision to enlist for an additional year to attend the U.S. Army's Grave Registration School at Army Mortuary System Europe in Prince George County, Virginia.

After completion of Grave Reservation School in 1966, Boetticher received orders to be assigned to an Infantry Regiment and then transferred to a Medic Mobilized Unit in Augsburg, Germany. Being a funeral director and apprentice embalmer, he was then reassigned to the Army Mortuary Affairs System Europe in Frankfurt, Germany, where he served as a supply sergeant and embalmer. Boetticher was honorably discharged in 1970 as a Sergeant First Class, but remained in Frankfurt, working for the U.S. Army PX system until his return to United States in 1970 with his wife and son Bob, Jr.

== Career ==
After his return to the Santa Monica, California in 1970, Boetticher wanted to explore a career in the film industry working alongside his uncle, Budd Boetticher (1916-2001), a well-known movie director. But in need of steady employment for his growing family, he turned back to his lifelong ambitions in funeral service. He accepted a job at Gates Kingsley & Gates Mortuary in Santa Monica, California as an embalmer and funeral director. The firm was owned by Mark Gates and Virgle Kingsley and was acquired by SCI shortly thereafter in 1970, marking Boetticher's first position with the funeral service giant. He then graduated from the California College of Mortuary Science (now known as Cypress College) in 1971.

In 1974, Boetticher and his wife, Jarka, purchased a funeral home and flower shop in Jackson Hole, Wyoming, where he was elected Teton County Coroner, for Teton County, Jackson Hole, Wyoming, Teton National Park, and Yellowstone National Park. He was a founding member of the Wyoming Coroner's Association who was the force behind the development of the Coroner Basic Course at the Wyoming Law Enforcement Acadeny now mandated by Wyoming State Statute. Boetticher was a member of the International Association of Coroners and Medical Examiners. He went on to later purchase three other funeral homes throughout Wyoming and also held offices and received awards in local, national and state organizations.

In 1983, he rejoined SCI and relocated to Kansas City, Missouri, where he served in a variety of field funeral and cemetery operations and also served on the board of directors of the Kansas City Kansas Community College – Mortuary Science. He relocated to SCI headquarters in Houston, Texas in 1991, heading several departments and was temporarily reassigned to London, England in 1994 to assist with the company's merchandising efforts with newly acquired funeral homes. Boetticher's work has also contributed to technological innovations in death care. As concerns began to mount surrounding the safety of funeral professionals involved in embalming procedures, Boetticher worked as Project Manager for the research and development of a new embalming fluid, Infinity 2000, a phenol- and formaldehyde-free fluid that required no special safety precautions and was non-irritating to the embalmer's eyes and skin. Infinity 2000 also, unlike formaldehyde, allows organs to retain their natural color, which is of use in teaching at medical schools.

He is currently founder and formerly was President and CEO of LHT Consulting Group, a subsidiary of Service Corporation International. Since 1993, Boetticher has been Vice-Chairman/CEO and on May 22, 2018 was elected Chairman of the Board of the National Museum of Funeral History, a 35,000 sq. ft. facility located in Houston which houses the country's largest collection of funeral service artifacts. He has also served as Vice-Chairman of the Board of Regents for the Commonwealth Institute of Funeral Service since 1993. In 2014, Boetticher became President of The Heritage Club - National Funeral Director's Association, a charitable group that funds and supports educational endeavors in the funeral service industry. He also serves on the Board of Trustees of the Army and Navy Academy.

Boetticher has also had consulting assignments for museums, production companies, radio programs and feature films, including Gangs of New York and A Woman of Independent Means. His television credits include work on Six Feet Under, the History Channel and the Discovery Channel.

== Personal life ==
Boetticher is married to Jaroslava Rydlova Boetticher for the past 55 years, a Czech-born physical therapist, whom he met in Germany during his service with the U.S. Army. They currently reside in Houston, Texas and have three children, Robert M. Boetticher Jr. (1970), Keven H. Boetticher (1975) and John P. Boetticher (1978).
