= The Texas Bucket List =

American TV program

- Created by: Shane McAuliffe
- Presented by: Shane McAuliffe
- Country of origin: United States
- Original language: English

Production
- Production company: McAuliffe Productions

Original release
- Release: 2013

The Texas Bucket List is a weekly, nationally-syndicated television program created, hosted and written by Shane McAuliffe and produced, shot, and edited by Donnie Laffoday. The show is filmed either on location somewhere in Texas or at The Texas Bucket List Store & Studio in College Station, TX.

The show airs on broadcast affiliates in all 22 Texas media markets, as well as stations in Laughlin, NV, Greenville, NC, Knoxville, TN, and nationally on RFD-TV. The Texas Bucket List airs two seasons per year, each consisting of 13 episodes, the first 11 featuring one Bite of the Week food segment and two other segments covering "everything to see, do, and eat in Texas". The 12th episode of each season features the top 5 Bite of the Week segments from that season, with the best restaurant or food truck being crowned the Bite of the Season and given a plaque to display in their business. The final episode of the spring season is the Summer Special featuring renewed segments on past bucket list stops that are ideal for summer road trips. The final episode of the fall season is the Holiday Special featuring 3 holiday-themed stops.

The Texas Bucket List posts its show segments on its website as well as its YouTube channel and Facebook page. The show completes its 20th season in the spring of 2023. Current sponsors of The Texas Bucket List include Simmons Bank, Slovacek's, Dairy Queen, and Toyota.

The Texas Bucket List started in 2009 on KBTX as The Brazos Valley Bucket List, an annual month-long series started by McAuliffe that showcased events and things to do in the Brazos Valley. In 2013, McAuliffe began his own syndicated TV show and expanded “The List” to cover the entire state, creating The Texas Bucket List. McAuliffe’s former station, KBTX, was the first to pick up the show.

== Show segments ==
=== Texas places ===
- Newman’s Castle and Bakery, owned by Mike Newman and originally featured on KBTX’s Brazos Valley Bucket List.
- 'Jacob’s Dream Sculpture' at Abilene Christian University, created by Jack Maxwell, aired on April 4, 2015.
- Shelby County Courthouse, located in Center, Texas and featured on the St. Patrick’s Day special episode.
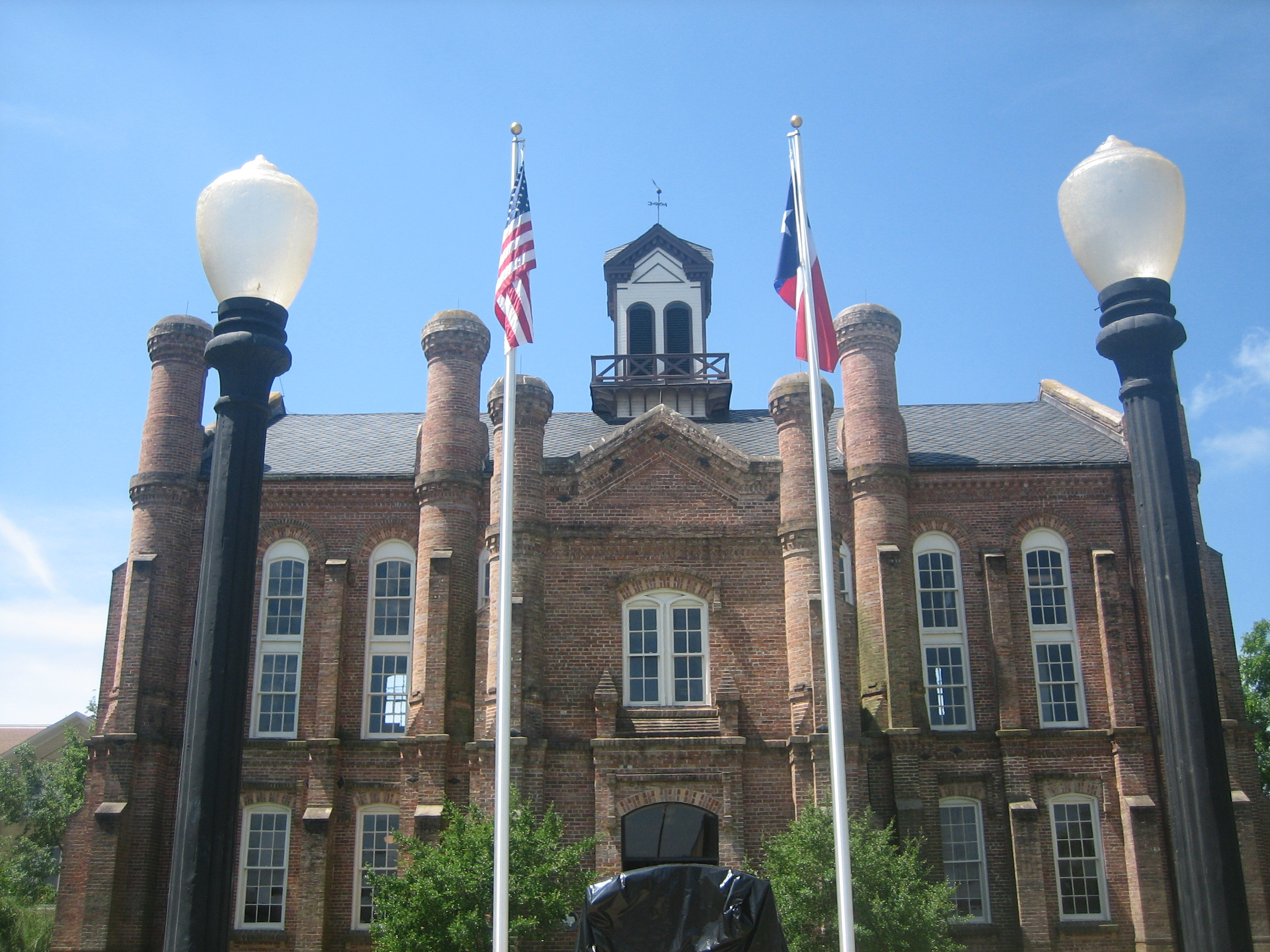
  Previous courthouse in Shelby County, TX IMG 0957
- Luckenbach, Texas, known as a country music hub and featured on the first episode of the show.
- El Cosmico, tent and teepee motel in Marfa, Texas where customers can stay in a safari tent, a teepee, or a vintage trailer.
- H.E. Sproul Ranch, located in Fort Davis, Texas and allows patrons to hunt game and take tours of the ranch.
- McDonald Observatory, astronomical observatory part of the University of Texas at Austin.
- Billy Bob's Texas, self-promoted as “The World’s Largest Honky-Tonk.”
- San Antonio Western Shooting LLC provides a firing range and replica guns for customers to shoot.
- Colorado Bend State Park, located in the Hill Country region and features Gorman Falls, spelunking, biking, hiking, and other outdoor activities.
- Rattlesnake round-up, annual event held by the Jaycees of Sweetwater, Texas.
- Zilker Zephyr, miniature railway attraction located in Zilker Park in Austin, Texas.
- La Posada Hotel in Laredo, Texas, built in 1916 and formerly stood as Laredo High School. Located next to the Republic of the Rio Grande Museum.
- Palo Duro Canyon, second largest canyon system in the United States after the Grand Canyon.
- Caprock Canyons State Park and Trailway in Quitaque, Texas, home to the last remaining stock of the Southern plains bison.
- South Padre Island Dolphin Research and Sea Life Nature Center, offers sea life exhibits, interactive touch tanks, and tours in search of the Bottlenose dolphin.
- Broken Spoke, honky-tonk in Austin, Texas founded in 1964 by owner James M. White.
- Kemp’s ridley sea turtle annual release on the Padre Island National Seashore.
- XIT Rodeo & Reunion, held on the XIT Ranch, formerly the largest fenced-in rangeland in the world located in the Texas Panhandle.
- Tee Pee Motel, located in Wharton, Texas. Bought by Texas Lottery winner Bryon Woods in 2003.
- Ben’s Western Wear and hat museum, western wear clothing store that doubles as a cowboy hat museum.
- Santa Maria Bullring in La Gloria, Texas, owned by Don Fred Renk, location of annual bloodless bullfight.
- Universal Typewriter Shop, owned and operated by Edward “Smitty” Smith, located in Houston, Texas and dedicated to repairing typewriters.

=== Texas history ===
- Judge Roy Bean, focus of the Judge Roy Bean Visitor Center, formerly managed by Jack Skiles, author of the biography Judge Roy Bean Country.
- Frontier Texas! Museum, an interactive museum on the western heritage of the Texas frontier and the Abilene region. Featured on the show in the fall of 2014.
- Mission San Jose, located in San Antonio, Texas, predates the Alamo and home to the largest concentration of Spanish colonial architecture.
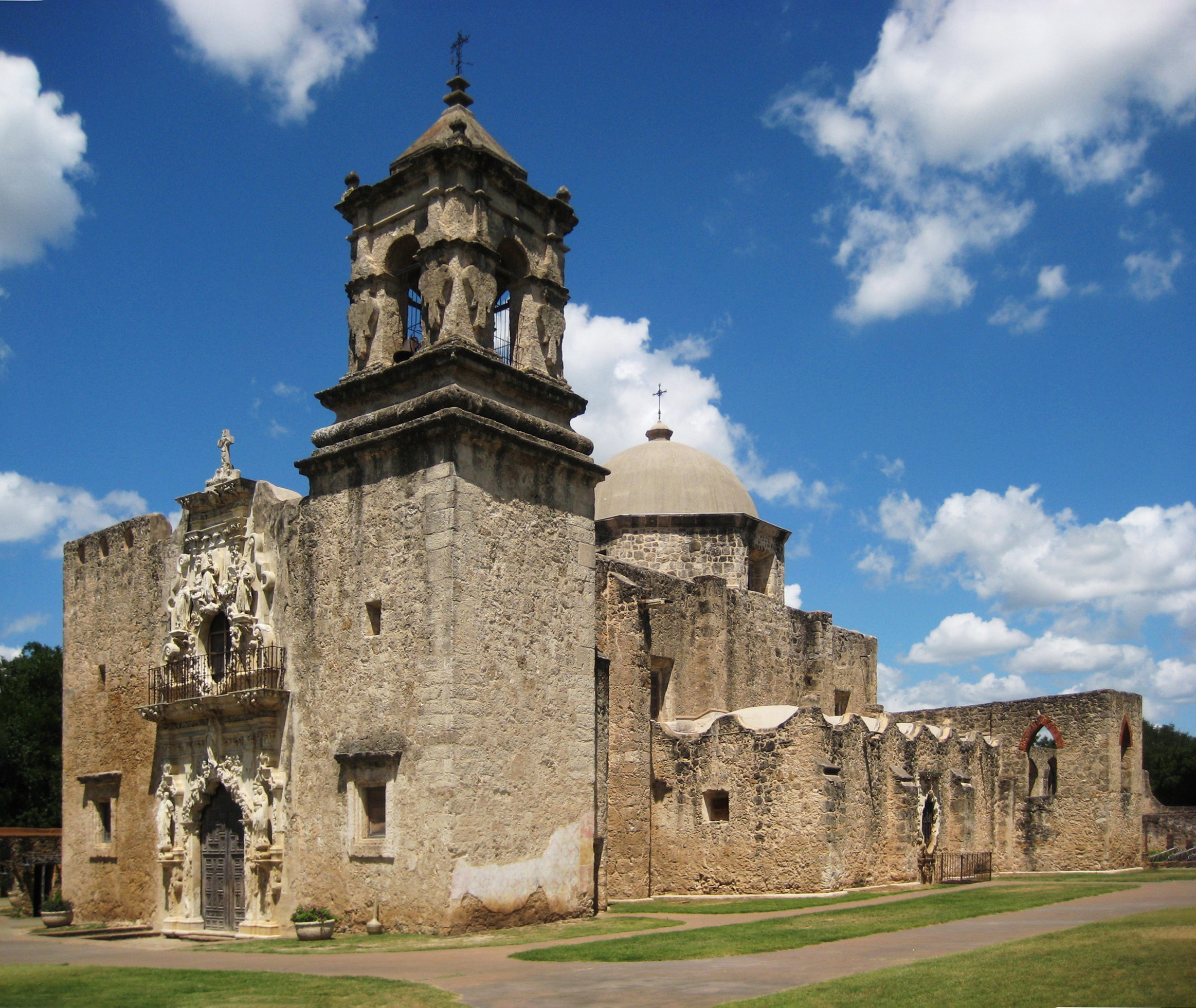
  Mission San José San Antonio
- Port Isabel Lighthouse, built in 1852 and the only lighthouse on the Gulf Coast that lets patrons climb to the top.
- American Wind Power Center, home to over 160 old-fashioned and modern windmills located in Lubbock, Texas.
- M-Line Trolley historic trolley rides, famously runs the oldest streetcar used daily in North America.
- Texas! Outdoor Musical founded in 1966 by Margaret Pease Harper and celebrated its 50th season in 2016.
- National Museum of Funeral History established in 1992 by Robert L. Waltrip, chairman and founder of Service Corporation International.
- Elissa, one of the oldest ships still operated today and moored in Galveston, Texas.
- Texas Museum of Broadcasting and Communications, covers the history of radio and television and managed by curator Chuck Conrad.
- USS Lexington, a museum ship located in Corpus Christi, Texas.
- Iwo Jima Monument, the original full-sized molding-plaster model of the bronze Marine Corps War Memorial, located on the grounds of the Marine Military Academy in Harlingen, Texas. Donated by Felix de Weldon in October 1981.

=== Texas food ===
- Old Orange Cafe in Orange, Texas. The restaurant is located in a historic former dairy. The Fiesta Burger is featured as the "Burger of the Week." Also highlighted was the restaurant's recovery from Hurricane Ike.
- Willy Burger, located in Beaumont, Texas, won "Burger of the Season" in the spring 2014 season for their Hee-haw burger.
- MG’s Restaurant in Sherman, Texas, featured in the spring of 2014 for their Hot Rod Ford burger.
- Marco’s Burgers and Fries, located in Mission, Texas, and winner of the first "Burger of the Season" on the show in the fall of 2013.
- Padre Island Burger Company, featured on the second episode of the fall 2014 season for their Dr. Padre burger.
- Good Luck Grill, aired on the spring of 2014 season of the show for their Triple Crown burger and located in Manor, Texas.
- Pop’s Burger Stand, located in Waxahachie, Texas and featured for their Low & Slow BBQ burger in the spring of 2016.
- Perini Ranch Steakhouse, famous steakhouse that was scheduled to cater the 2001 Congressional Picnic for former United States president George W. Bush, but was cancelled due to the events of the 9/11 terror attacks and returned to cater the picnic the following year. The steakhouse won "Burger of the Season" for season 3 of ‘’The Texas Bucket List’’ in 2014.
- East Texas Burger Company in Mineola, Texas, known for their burgers and baked and fried pies. Winner of the County Line Magazine’s ‘Best Burger’ award in 2012 and 2014.
- Middle East Restaurant, located in Abilene, Texas, and owned by Sabah Hammoodi, who worked for the American military in Iraq after the implementation of Operation Iraqi Freedom in 2003.
- Rodeo Goat, featured on the Christmas edition of the fall of 2014 season of the show for their Ho-ho Buffalo burger.
- Mel’s Country Grill, famous for their Mega Mel burger challenge. Customers that consume the entire burger win a Mel’s Café T-shirt and their name on the café’s online list of ‘Mega Mel Survivors.’
- Golden Light Café, established in 1946 on U.S. Route 66 in Amarillo, Texas. Claims to be the oldest continuously operated store on the route that has not changed its location.
- Big Top Candy Shop, founded in 2007 by Brandon Hodge. Decorated in a circus-theme and offers over 2000 varieties of candy as well as a soda fountain.
- Hondo’s on Main, named after John Russel “Hondo” Crouch, one of the owners who bought and made the town of Luckenbach, Texas famous.
- Fred’s Texas Café, located in Fort Worth, Texas and featured on the show for their Diablo burger.
- Stanton Drug & Grill, originated as a bank in 1906, reopened as a pharmacy in 1951.
- Border Burger, located on the border of Texas and Mexico in Eagle Pass, Texas. Featured on the show for their Jalapeño burger.
- Stanton City Bites, opened as a grocery in 1961 and gradually converted into a restaurant owned and managed by Theresa and Jonathan Fong.
- Jenschke Orchards, located in Fredericksburg, Texas, known for their fresh peaches and peach products since 1961.
- Fossati's Delicatessen, the oldest deli in Texas, established in 1882.
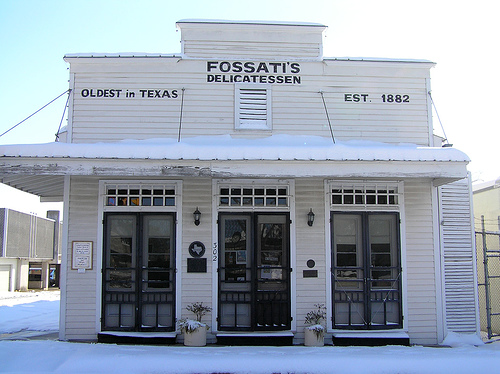
  Fossati'sDeli
- Gold’n Crisp, located in La Grange, Texas and opened in 1972. Served meals for the infamous Chicken Ranch brothel.
- King’s Inn, formerly a bait shop opened in 1935 in Riviera, Texas that now serves fried seafood.
- Blake’s Snow Shack, owned and operated by Blake Pyron, potentially the only business owner in Texas with Down syndrome. Also the youngest business owner in Denton County, Texas.

=== Texas music ===
- The Merles, classic country and western swing music band featured on season 4 of The Texas Bucket List.
- Maria D'Luz, pianist, singer and songwriter raised in Brownsville, Texas.
- Shinyribs, American country soul and swamp-funk blend founded by lead singer and songwriter Kevin Russell.
- The Derailers, country music band with current members Brian Hofeldt, Scott Matthews, Sweet Basil McJagger, and Bracken Hale from Austin, Texas.
- Brice Woolard Band, Texas country music band from College Station, Texas with members Brice Woolard, Isaac Spelce, Dave Durkovic, and Will Skiles.
- Rankin Twins, country music duo featuring Amy and April Rankin.
- Mel Davis and the Blues Specialists, blues band with members Mel Davis, Lawrence Bell, Rob Richardson, and Isaac Bratchett playing in the Austin, Texas area for over 28 years.
- Gary P. Nunn, Texas country music singer from Okmulgee, Oklahoma. Nunn’s song “Taking Texas to the Country” is featured as the theme song for The Texas Bucket List.
- Haley Cole, country music singer and songwriter. Co-wrote the song ‘’One Place Too Long’’ with songwriter Bobby Hamrick for the TV series Nashville.
- Josh Grider, Texas country music singer and songwriter, musical origins in Waco, Texas.
- Jay White & The Blues Commanders, blues band from Texas with band members Jay White, John Mills, Allen Huff, and Kevin Hall.
- Shotgun Rider, Texas music duo with lead vocalist Logan Samford and songwriter Anthony Enriquez.
- Josh Ward, country music artist from Houston, Texas.

== Related Links ==
- Official website
