= List of counties in Washington =

Counties of Washington
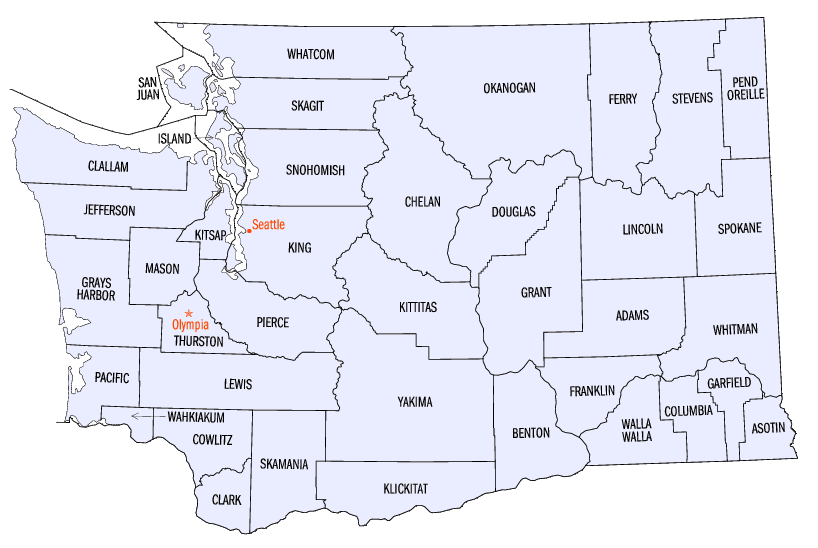
- Location: State of Washington
- Number: 39
- Populations: 2,416 (Garfield) – 2,344,939 (King)
- Areas: 175 square miles (450 km^{2}) (San Juan) – 5,268 square miles (13,640 km^{2}) (Okanogan)
- Government: County government
- Subdivisions: cities, towns, townships, Indian reservations

The U.S. state of Washington has 39 counties. The Provisional Government of Oregon established Vancouver and Lewis Counties in 1845 in unorganized Oregon Country, extending from the Columbia River north to 54°40′ north latitude. After the region was organized within the Oregon Territory with the current northern border of 49° north, Vancouver County was renamed Clark, and six more counties were created out of Lewis County before the organization of Washington Territory in 1853; 28 were formed during Washington's territorial period, two of which only existed briefly. The final five were established in the 22 years after Washington was admitted to the Union as the 42nd state in 1889.

Article XI of the Washington State Constitution addresses the organization of counties. New counties must have a population of at least 2,000 and no county can be reduced to a population below 4,000 due to partitioning to create a new county. To alter the area of a county, the state constitution requires a petition of the "majority of the voters" in that area. A number of county partition proposals in the 1990s interpreted this as a majority of people who voted, until a 1998 ruling by the Washington Supreme Court clarified that they would need a majority of registered voters. No changes to counties have been made since the formation of Pend Oreille County in 1911, except when the small area of Cliffdell was moved from Kittitas to Yakima County in 1970.

King County, home to the state's largest city, Seattle, holds almost 30% of Washington's population (2,344,939 residents of 8,001,020 in 2025), and has the highest population density, with more than 1,000 people per square mile (400/km^{2}). Garfield County is both the least populated (2,416) and least densely populated (3.4/sq mi [1.3/km^{2}]). Two counties, San Juan and Island, are composed only of islands. The average county is 1,830 square miles (4,700 km^{2}), with 205,154 people.

Seventeen counties have Native American–derived names, including nine names of tribes whose land settlers would occupy. Another seventeen were named for political figures, only five of whom had lived in the region. The last five are named for geographic places.

The Federal Information Processing Standard (FIPS) code, used by the United States government to uniquely identify counties, is provided with each entry. The FIPS code links in the table point to U.S. Census data pages for each county. Washington's FIPS state code is 53.

== Governance ==
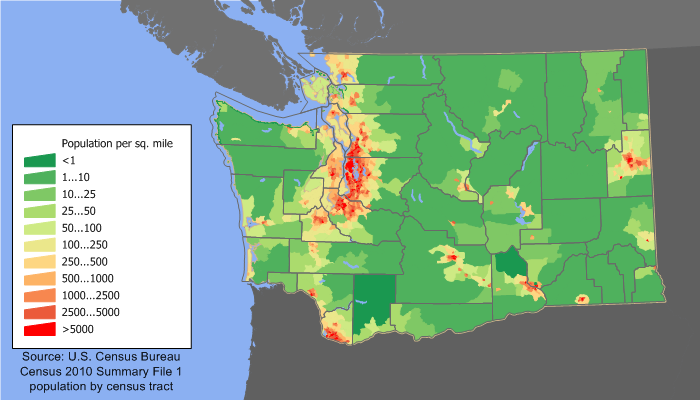
Population density map of Washington

Counties provide a broad scope of services, including court operation, parks and recreation, libraries, arts, social services, elections, waste collection, roads and transportation, zoning and permitting, as well as taxation. The extent of these vary, and some are administered by municipalities. Counties are not subdivided into minor civil divisions like townships; sub-county local government is only by incorporated cities and towns, as well as by 29 Indian reservations, while unincorporated areas are governed only by the county. There are 242 census county divisions for statistical purposes only.

The default form of county government is the non-charter commission, with three to five elected commissioners serving as both the legislature and executive. Seven counties have adopted charters providing for home rule distinct from state law: King, Clallam, Whatcom, Snohomish, Pierce, San Juan, and Clark. Of these, King, Whatcom, Snohomish, and Pierce, four major counties on Puget Sound, elect a county executive. Councils in the other three charter counties appoint a manager to administer the government. Voters may also elect a clerk, treasurer, sheriff, assessor, coroner, auditor (or recorder), and prosecuting attorney. Elections are nonpartisan in non-charter counties, but charter counties may choose to make some positions partisan, though all elections are by top-two primary.

== List of counties ==
Counties of Washington
County	FIPS code	County seat	Est.	Formed from	Etymology	Population (2025)	Land area	Map
Adams County	001	Ritzville	November 28, 1883	Whitman County	John Adams (1735–1826), 2nd U.S. President	21,488	1,925 sq mi (4,986 km^{2})	State map highlighting Adams County
Asotin County	003	Asotin	October 27, 1883	Garfield County	The Nez Percé name for Eel Creek	22,545	636 sq mi (1,647 km^{2})	State map highlighting Asotin County
Benton County	005	Prosser	March 8, 1905	Yakima and Klickitat Counties	Thomas Hart Benton (1782–1858), a U.S. Senator from Missouri	221,722	1,700 sq mi (4,403 km^{2})	State map highlighting Benton County
Chelan County	007	Wenatchee	March 13, 1899	Okanogan and Kittitas Counties	A Native American word meaning "deep water", referring to Lake Chelan	81,941	2,920 sq mi (7,563 km^{2})	State map highlighting Chelan County
Clallam County	009	Port Angeles	April 26, 1854	Jefferson County	A Klallam word meaning "brave people" or "the strong people"	78,202	1,738 sq mi (4,501 km^{2})	State map highlighting Clallam County
Clark County	011	Vancouver	August 20, 1845	Original County	William Clark (1770–1838), the co-captain of the Lewis and Clark Expedition	532,119	629 sq mi (1,629 km^{2})	State map highlighting Clark County
Columbia County	013	Dayton	November 11, 1875	Walla Walla County	The Columbia River	4,141	869 sq mi (2,251 km^{2})	State map highlighting Columbia County
Cowlitz County	015	Kelso	April 21, 1854	Lewis County	Cowlitz, an Indian tribe	114,885	1,139 sq mi (2,950 km^{2})	State map highlighting Cowlitz County
Douglas County	017	Waterville	November 28, 1883	Lincoln County	Stephen A. Douglas (1813–1861), U.S. Senator from Illinois	46,473	1,819 sq mi (4,711 km^{2})	State map highlighting Douglas County
Ferry County	019	Republic	February 21, 1899	Stevens County	Elisha P. Ferry (1825–1895), 1st Governor of Washington	7,517	2,204 sq mi (5,708 km^{2})	State map highlighting Ferry County
Franklin County	021	Pasco	November 28, 1883	Whitman County	Benjamin Franklin (1706–1790), writer, orator, inventor, and U.S. Founding Father	102,612	1,242 sq mi (3,217 km^{2})	State map highlighting Franklin County
Garfield County	023	Pomeroy	November 29, 1881	Columbia County	James A. Garfield (1831–1881), 20th U.S. President	2,416	710 sq mi (1,839 km^{2})	State map highlighting Garfield County
Grant County	025	Ephrata	February 24, 1909	Douglas County	Ulysses S. Grant (1822–1885), 18th U.S. President	105,727	2,680 sq mi (6,941 km^{2})	State map highlighting Grant County
Grays Harbor County	027	Montesano	April 14, 1854	Thurston County	Grays Harbor, a body of water named after explorer and merchant Robert Gray (1755–1806)	78,144	1,902 sq mi (4,926 km^{2})	State map highlighting Grays Harbor County
Island County	029	Coupeville	December 22, 1852	Thurston County	Consists solely of islands, including Whidbey and Camano islands	85,657	209 sq mi (541 km^{2})	State map highlighting Island County
Jefferson County	031	Port Townsend	December 22, 1852	Thurston County	Thomas Jefferson (1743–1826), 3rd U.S. President and principal author of the Declaration of Independence	33,970	1,804 sq mi (4,672 km^{2})	State map highlighting Jefferson County
King County	033	Seattle	December 22, 1852	Thurston County	William R. King (1786–1853), U.S. Vice President under Franklin Pierce; officially renamed in 2005 after civil rights leader Martin Luther King Jr. (no relation) (1929–1968)	2,344,939	2,115 sq mi (5,478 km^{2})	State map highlighting King County
Kitsap County	035	Port Orchard	January 16, 1857	King and Jefferson Counties	Chief Kitsap (d. 1860), leader of the Suquamish tribe	283,374	395 sq mi (1,023 km^{2})	State map highlighting Kitsap County
Kittitas County	037	Ellensburg	November 24, 1883	Yakima County	Yakama word of uncertain meaning, with popular translations ranging from "white chalk" to "land of the plenty"	48,803	2,297 sq mi (5,949 km^{2})	State map highlighting Kittitas County
Klickitat County	039	Goldendale	December 20, 1859	Walla Walla County	Klickitat tribe, also meaning "robber" and "beyond"	24,331	1,872 sq mi (4,848 km^{2})	State map highlighting Klickitat County
Lewis County	041	Chehalis	December 21, 1845	Clark County	Meriwether Lewis (1774–1809), the co-captain of the Lewis and Clark Expedition	88,062	2,403 sq mi (6,224 km^{2})	State map highlighting Lewis County
Lincoln County	043	Davenport	November 24, 1883	Whitman County	Abraham Lincoln (1809–1865), 16th U.S. President	11,982	2,311 sq mi (5,985 km^{2})	State map highlighting Lincoln County
Mason County	045	Shelton	March 13, 1854	King County	Charles H. Mason (1830–1859), 1st Secretary of Washington Territory	71,165	959 sq mi (2,484 km^{2})	State map highlighting Mason County
Okanogan County	047	Okanogan	February 2, 1888	Stevens County	A Salish word meaning "rendezvous"	45,230	5,268 sq mi (13,644 km^{2})	State map highlighting Okanogan County
Pacific County	049	South Bend	February 3, 1851	Lewis County	The Pacific Ocean	24,357	933 sq mi (2,416 km^{2})	State map highlighting Pacific County
Pend Oreille County	051	Newport	March 1, 1911	Stevens County	The Pend d'Oreille tribe, named by French traders for their "ear bobs"	14,457	1,400 sq mi (3,626 km^{2})	State map highlighting Pend Oreille County
Pierce County	053	Tacoma	December 22, 1852	Thurston County	Franklin Pierce (1804–1869), 14th U.S. President	946,288	1,670 sq mi (4,325 km^{2})	State map highlighting Pierce County
San Juan County	055	Friday Harbor	October 31, 1873	Whatcom County	San Juan Islands, itself derived from Juan Vicente de Güemes	18,577	174 sq mi (451 km^{2})	State map highlighting San Juan County
Skagit County	057	Mount Vernon	November 28, 1883	Whatcom County	The Skagit tribe	132,975	1,731 sq mi (4,483 km^{2})	State map highlighting Skagit County
Skamania County	059	Stevenson	March 9, 1854	Clark County	A Chinookan word meaning "swift water"	12,669	1,656 sq mi (4,289 km^{2})	State map highlighting Skamania County
Snohomish County	061	Everett	January 14, 1861	Island and King Counties	The Snohomish tribe, word origin disputed	870,656	2,087 sq mi (5,405 km^{2})	State map highlighting Snohomish County
Spokane County	063	Spokane	October 30, 1879	Stevens County	The Spokane tribe	558,344	1,764 sq mi (4,569 km^{2})	State map highlighting Spokane County
Stevens County	065	Colville	January 20, 1863	Walla Walla County	Isaac Stevens (1818–1862), 1st Governor of the Washington Territory	49,668	2,478 sq mi (6,418 km^{2})	State map highlighting Stevens County
Thurston County	067	Olympia	January 12, 1852	Lewis County	Samuel Thurston (1815–1851), the Oregon Territory's first delegate to U.S. Congress	304,261	722 sq mi (1,870 km^{2})	State map highlighting Thurston County
Wahkiakum County	069	Cathlamet	April 25, 1854	Cowlitz County	Wakaiakam, chief of the Kathlamet tribe	4,873	264 sq mi (684 km^{2})	State map highlighting Wahkiakum County
Walla Walla County	071	Walla Walla	April 25, 1854	Skamania County	The Walla Walla tribe, also a Nez Percé name for running water	62,361	1,270 sq mi (3,289 km^{2})	State map highlighting Walla Walla County
Whatcom County	073	Bellingham	March 9, 1854	Island County	Whatcom, chief of the Nooksack tribe and named for a Nooksack word meaning "noisy water"	236,392	2,107 sq mi (5,457 km^{2})	State map highlighting Whatcom County
Whitman County	075	Colfax	January 2, 1872	Stevens County	Marcus Whitman (1802–1847), a Methodist missionary	48,512	2,159 sq mi (5,592 km^{2})	State map highlighting Whitman County
Yakima County	077	Yakima	January 21, 1865	Ferguson County (defunct)	The Yakama tribe, meaning "runaway [waters]" or "big belly"	259,185	4,296 sq mi (11,127 km^{2})	State map highlighting Yakima County

== Former county names ==
Four counties changed their name between 1849 and 1925.

- Chehalis County, originally named for the Chehalis people, was renamed Grays Harbor County in 1915.
- Sawamish County, originally named for the Sahewamish Native American tribe, was renamed Mason County in 1864.
- Slaughter County, originally named for Lieutenant William A. Slaughter who was killed during the Indian Wars, was renamed Kitsap County shortly after its formation in 1857. The initial proposals for this county called it Madison County or Kitsap County.
- Vancouver County, originally named for George Vancouver, was renamed Clarke County in 1849 and corrected to Clark in 1925.

== Former counties ==
During Washington's territorial period, Washington split off from an Oregon county, three counties were disestablished, and three split into separate territories.

- Clackamas County, Oregon was established in 1844 and included the land south and east of the Columbia River until Washington Territory was formed in 1853, when the area was no longer organized as a county.
- Spokane County was established in Washington Territory in 1858 until it merged into Stevens County in 1864; it was reestablished in 1879.
- Missoula County was established in Washington Territory in 1860 until it split off with the Idaho Territory in 1863.
- Shoshone County, Idaho County, and Nez Perce County were established in Washington Territory in 1861, and Boise County in 1863, until they split off into the Idaho Territory in March 1863, leaving the current borders of Washington.
- Ferguson County, named for Washington legislator James L. Ferguson, was established on January 23, 1863, from Walla Walla County and dissolved on January 18, 1865. Yakima County was established in its place.
- Quillehuyte County was split from Jefferson and Clallam counties in 1868 and returned to those counties a year later before it could be organized.

== Proposed counties ==
Several counties were proposed prior to or during the existence of Washington Territory and nine counties were proposed within the first 16 years of Washington's statehood, but none were established.

- The representatives at the Cowlitz Convention of 1851 discussed a proposal to form Columbia Territory, which included a number of new counties in what later became Washington. The next session of the Oregon Territorial Legislature created only one of these counties: Thurston County (which was originally proposed as Simmons County).
- Buchanan County was proposed in 1856 as a division of Clark County.
- Proposed counties during Washington's early statehood included Big Bend (1891), Palouse (1891 and 1903), Sherman (1891), Washington (1891), Wenatchee (1893), McKinley (1903), Steptoe (1903), and Coulee (1905).
- Since the 1990s, there have been several proposals for county secession in Washington, largely from rural areas in the major counties of Western Washington. Cedar, Freedom, and Skykomish counties submitted petitions to secede from King and Snohomish counties in 1995 and 1996, with some support in the state legislature to put them to a public referendum.

== See also ==
- List of United States counties and county equivalents
- Government of Washington
