= Maria D'Luz =

American singer-songwriter

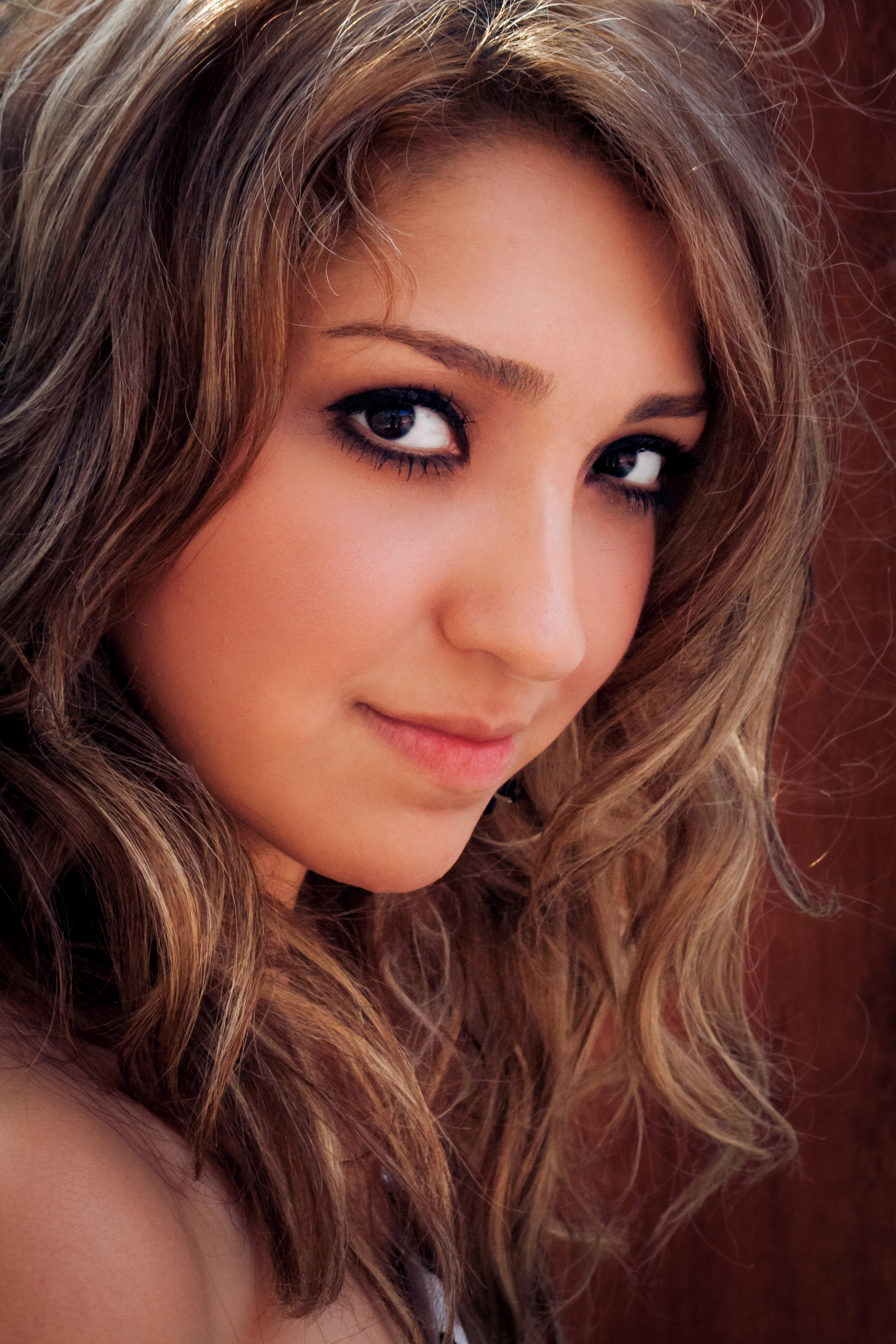

Background information
- Birth name: Dulce María González Aldaz
- Also known as: Dulce Maria Gonzalez, Dulce Aldaz
- Born: August 5, 1986 (age 39); Matamoros, Tamaulipas Mexico
- Genres: Pop, Latin, tejano, Mexican cumbia, R&B, jazz
- Occupation(s): Singer, songwriter, musician
- Instrument(s): Vocals, piano
- Years active: 1991–present
- Labels: Independent, Maple Music Chords (BMI)
- Website: www.mariadluz.com

Maria D'Luz (born Dulce María González Aldaz; August 5, 1986) is a Mexican-American singer and songwriter.

== Career ==
She was raised in Brownsville, Texas, where she began playing piano before her fourth birthday. She performed with her sisters in a children's educational, bilingual, and musical TV show, "Cantos y Cuentos Con Ani", which ranked number one in its Saturday morning time slot.

Later, she continued classical piano studies that evolved into jazz, vocal performance, and flamenco dancing. At age 9 she participated in "Juguemos A Cantar" (a National Singing Contest in Mexico by Televisa) in the program "Siempre En Domingo" with Raul Velasco, representing the states of Tamaulipas and San Luis Potosí in Mexico. At age 14, she performed with her band "Dulce y Sol Latino" at The Millennium Stage at John F. Kennedy Center for the Performing Arts in Washington, D.C., for being the winner of "Hollywood 2000" Texas Talent Showcase BSPA in Brownsville, TX., chosen by judges: Sam Riddle "Star Search", Helen Hernandez "The Imagen Foundation" and Yvonne Vega from Paramount Pictures.

At the age of 15, D'Luz wrote her first song titled "What Is Wrong With The World" which later became part of her first album, "Just Notes", an 11 track CD, all written and composed by D'Luz herself, and was released on August 4, 2007. As a songwriter, she has written "Falsa Felicidad", recorded by Jimmy Gonzalez y el Grupo Mazz, in the album: La Leyenda Continua, Billboard Charts - Latin Album #37, receiving a Latin Grammy for Best Tejano Album in 2008. Shortly after, she releases the Hillary Clinton campaign song "We Need A Woman" and accepts an interview by Soledad O'Brien from CNN.

In 2008, Objetivo Fama Univision Online announced D'Luz the winner of a 2009 Pontiac Vibe for obtaining the highest number of online votes for her arrangement and video version of "Hasta Que Me Olvides".

The John Lennon Songwriting Contest, a prestigious international competition for songwriters, awarded D'Luz in the Latin category as a finalist for bossa-nova ballad "Lo Solucionare" and an Honorable Mention for Latin-pop tune "No Te Vi" in 2006., 1st finalist with "Podria Ser Un Angel" in 2012 and later that year, a finalist for pop tune, "Es".

D'Luz joined the Hermes Music Foundation early 2010, and was invited to join the "Proyecto De Amor - Claro Que Se Puede" CD to benefit Hermes Music Foundation. D'Luz performed in this CD with artists Carlos Santana, Willie Nelson, Los Lonely Boys, El Tri, Elefante, Del Castillo, Alberto Cortez, Deepak Chopra, Reyli, Jorge Guevara, Ramon Ayala, and many more. D'Luz's vocals can be heard on songs "La Vida Es Un Sueño" and "Amalos," two of 15-tracks on the album. All songs were written by Hermes Music Foundation president Alberto Kreimerman.

D'Luz performed with Elefante for Jugueton ("Toy Marathon") 2010 in Los Angeles and has been an opening act for artists Jose Jose, Leo Dan, King Clave, Yerbabuena & Nick Vujicic. She performed for social activist Dolores Huerta during the celebration of the naming of Dolores Huerta Avenue, the first street in her name.

In 2013 and 2014, D'Luz was invited to perform multiple times at Houston's House of Blues. She also performed with her band at the Springboard South music festival in Houston in June 2014 at Warehouse Live, a live entertainment venue located in Houston. D'Luz also performs as a duo act with a rumba/flamenco guitarist, Mario Aleman, both performing as "Mario y Maria" where D'Luz sings, dances flamenco and plays cajon.

In August 2014, D'Luz released her second album, "While You Were Gone" including 11 original songs and a remake of "These Boots Are Made for Walkin'". The album was recorded and mixed at Gospa Studios in McAllen, TX and mastered at Lurssen Mastering, owned by Gavin Lurssen, a world-renowned multi Grammy award-winning mastering studio located in Hollywood, CA. To celebrate the completion of her second album, D'Luz provided her local friends and fans with a CD release party held at Havana Club in McAllen, TX. The album is available for purchase at iTunes, Amazon, CD Baby, etc.

On November 26, 2014, D'Luz was featured on The Texas Bucket List show, airing in Texas, Colorado, Nevada and North Carolina. D'Luz participated on March 28, 2015, on Sabado Gigante's "Competencia Internacional de Imitadores" where she impersonated Gloria Estefan and won the public's vote.

D'Luz performs weekly at local venues and teaches music classes. D'Luz also does Spanish voice-overs for a Brazilian cartoon, Bob Zoom, now being streamed on Netflix. D'Luz is currently working on a new Tejano/Tex-Mex CD album which will be released in the winter of 2015 that is being produced and arranged by Santiago Castilo and mixed/mastered by Gilbert Velasquez of Velasquez Music in San Antonio. She currently resides in McAllen, TX and is an online student at Berklee College of Music.
