= Coroner (Washington state) =

A coroner in the U.S. state of Washington is a quasi-judicial, public official principally charged with the certification of human death. It is completely identical in authority to the parallel office of medical examiner, which also exists in the state. Washington uses a "mixed system" of death investigation with some counties employing coroners, and some employing medical examiners.

As of 2017, 24 of Washington's 39 counties have a coroner or a medical examiner. In 15 rural counties there are neither coroners nor medical examiners; duties normally performed by a coroner or medical examiner are instead discharged by the county's prosecuting attorney.

This article uses the term "coroner" to refer to coroners, medical examiners, and county attorneys discharging the duties of coroners.

== History ==
=== Background and early history ===
The office of Coroner originated in England no later than 1194, though uncertain evidence indicates a possible older history. By the reign of Edward I, there were four coroners in each county, elected to serve for life. Coroners were charged with recording and investigating deaths, of administering treasure trove, and of substituting for the Sheriff when he was a party to a matter or incapacitated; the elected Coroner eventually evolved into a check on the power of the Crown-appointed Sheriff. The system of coronial death investigation was brought to North America by British colonists; one of the earliest coroners empowered in North America was appointed by William Penn in 1682 after a dead body was discovered on the banks of a river.

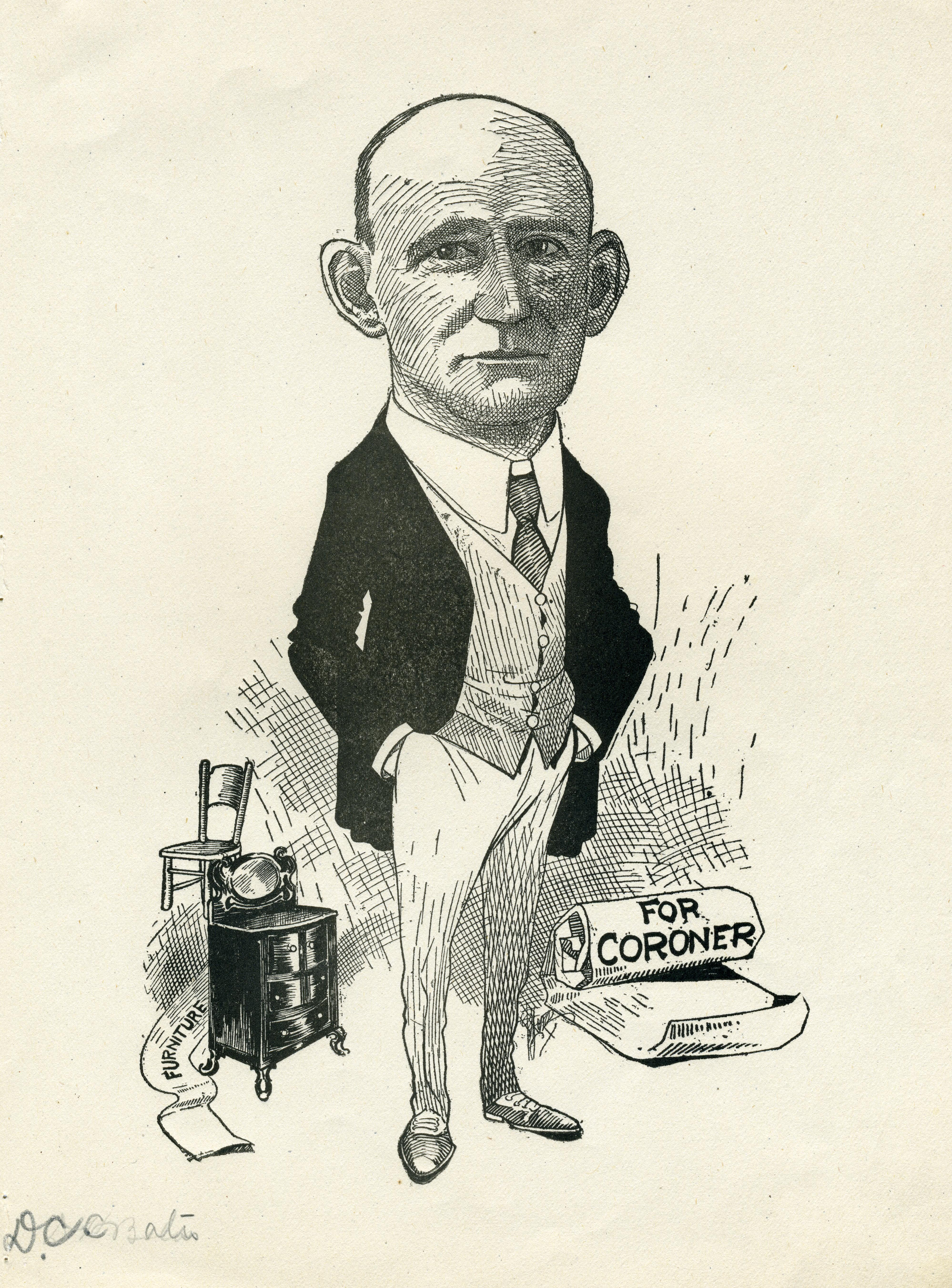
A caricature of D.C. Bates, candidate for Coroner of Thurston County in the 1908 election

The Washington Territory was established in 1853 and, the following year, the Territorial Legislature passed "An Act Relative to Coroners" which required each of the territory's counties to organize an election for coroner and to hold a new election every two years thereafter. This act also authorized the Coroner to perform the duties of the Sheriff in certain matters:

The Coroner shall perform the duties of sheriff in all cases where the sheriff is interested, or otherwise incapacitated from serving; and when the coroner acts as the sheriff, he shall possess the powers and perform all duties of the sheriff ...

=== Efforts at reform ===
As early as 1907, legislative attempts were made to require elected coroners be licensed physicians. In 1913 the legislature abolished the office of coroner in all counties, except "counties of the first class" (the largest counties in the state), devolving the duties of coroner to the office of county attorney. However, A.R. Maulsby, the coroner of Snohomish County - an office which had been abolished by the statute - refused to stand-down, declaring the act of the legislature to be unconstitutional. The state's Supreme Court eventually sided with Maulsby, noting that the state constitution, as it then read, required a system of county government "uniform throughout the state". In 1948, the constitution was substantially amended to allow differential forms of county government in certain circumstances.

In 1960 the Washington State Medical Association called for the complete abolition of the office of coroner, supporting its replacement with a system of state medial examiners and, in 1969, legislation was passed by the state's House of Representatives to do just that, however, the legislation failed in the state Senate.

=== Contemporary status ===
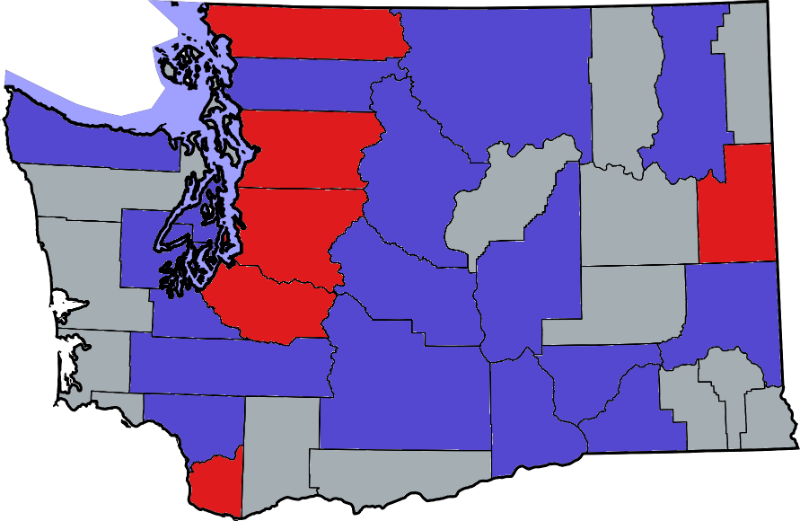
Map showing Washington counties which have coroners (blue), medical examiners (red), or neither (grey)

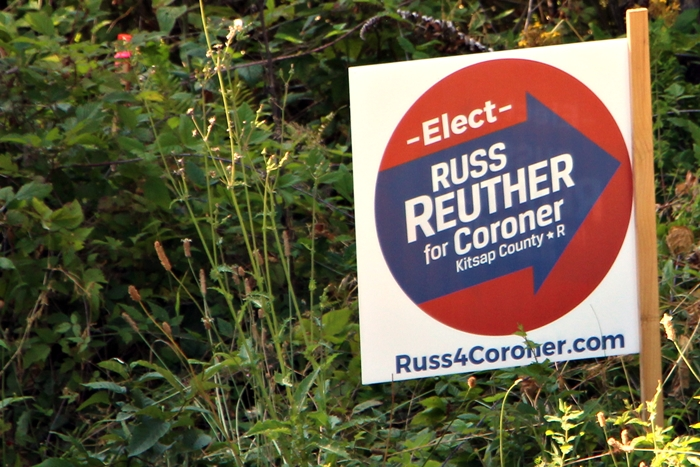
A campaign sign in the 2018 election for Coroner of Kitsap County, Washington

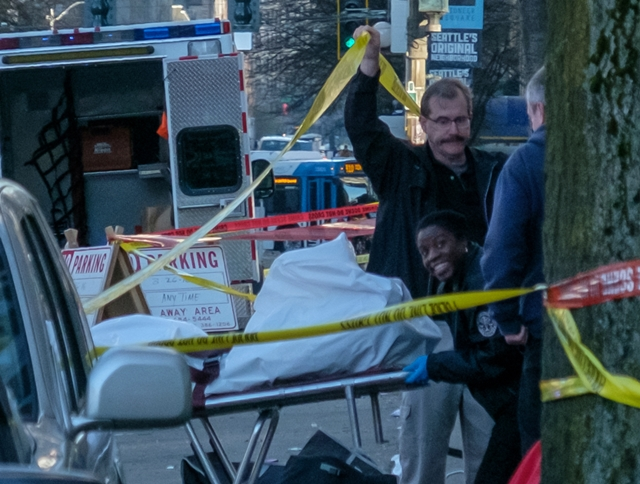
A staff member of the King County Medical Examiner's office moves human remains in Seattle in 2016.

The Revised Code of Washington, as of 2017, provides for the creation of an office of coroner in each county with a population of 40,000 or more. In counties with a population less than 40,000, no independent office of coroner is authorized and the duties which normally fall to a corner are discharged by the county's attorney instead. In addition, counties which have a population greater than 250,000 may choose to replace the office of corner with that of medical examiner. Medical examiners are elected by the legislative authority of the county in which they hold office and are required to be certified as a forensic pathologist by the American Board of Pathology, while coroners are elected by the voters of the county in which they hold office and are required to have no qualifications other than the right to vote.

In 1968, prior to the enactment of the medical examiner statute, 17 counties had coroners while the remaining 22 counties had no coroners, the county prosecuting attorney discharging the duties of coroner, instead. As of 2017 in Washington, 18 counties have coroners, six have medical examiners, and 15 have neither coroners nor medical examiners, the county attorney performs the functions otherwise discharged by a coroner or medical examiner.

== Duties and authority ==
=== Acting Sheriff ===
As of 2017, Washington law provides that a county coroner shall "perform the duties of the sheriff in all cases where the sheriff is interested or otherwise incapacitated from serving", wording unchanged from the original statute enacted by the Territorial Legislature in 1854.

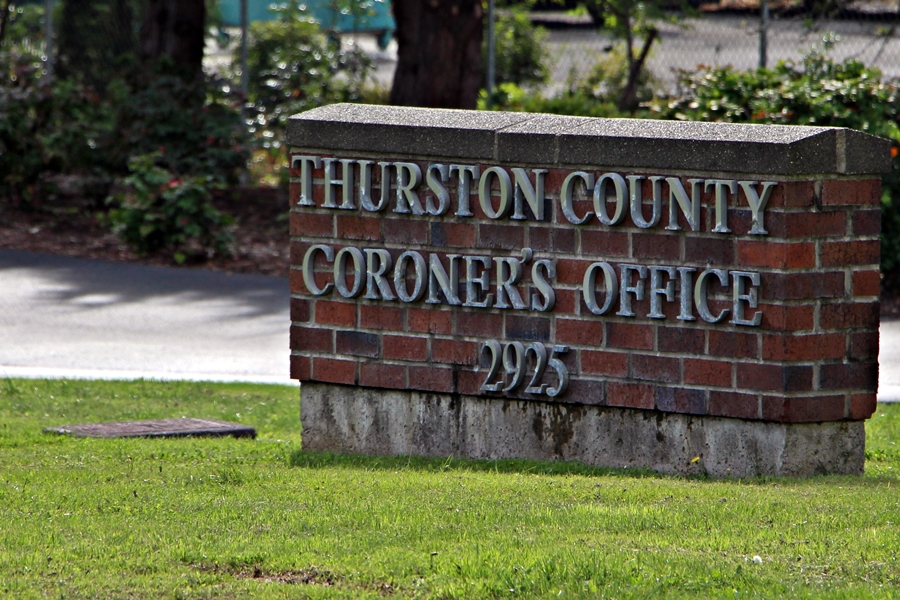
Entrance to the Thurston County Coroner's office in 2017

=== Death investigations ===
In general, deaths in Washington are either certified by physicians, or by licensed funeral directors using information obtained from a physician pertaining to a decedent's cause of death. Certification is made to one of a number of regional registries each administered by a designated "deputy registrar" who approves each addition to the death registry. However, state law provides that deaths arising from one of a list of prescribed mechanisms (including drowning, hanging, electrocution, radiation, sodomy, strangulation, etc.), or involving a healthy person who had not received medical attention in the 36 hours preceding their death, or in which the death occurred in a jail or prison, or in which the identity of the decedent is unknown, or in which the death occurred under suspicious circumstances, can only be certified by a county coroner. Physicians, deputy registrars, or any person discovering a body (such as a police officer) are legally obligated to refer these cases directly to coroners who are authorized to take possession of the body, to order a forensic autopsy on it, to pronounce the cause and mechanism of death, and to determine if the death was the result of unlawful homicide, which is necessary to bring criminal charges against a person.

In 2015, approximately 8.2 percent of all decedents in Washington were autopsied.

==== Inquests ====
The coroner is, additionally, empowered to convene an inquest to advise him on the cause of death prior to certifying the death. Inquests are conducted by a jury of at least four citizens convened by the coroner, hear evidence presented by him, and make an advisory verdict. The proceedings of an inquest are open to the public (investigations held outside an inquest are otherwise confidential and information produced by it - including autopsy reports - can only be released to certain individuals, such as law enforcement officers and next of kin).

The procedure is rarely used, but has been invoked on occasions where a death is controversial and the coroner feels public scrutiny would be warranted. In 2016, following the shooting death of an Hispanic man by police in Franklin County, Washington, the coroner convened an inquest of six jurors - appointing three Hispanic persons to the jury - to ensure that "the public can't say, 'it's the cops investigating the cops'". The inquest was only the third convened in Franklin County in the preceding twenty years and ultimately ruled the death was justifiable homicide by gunshot.

Prior to 2016, coroners had the authority to issue arrest warrants should an inquest determine a cause of death as unlawful homicide. Since that time, a change in state law has required coroners to refer findings of homicide to a county prosecuting attorney for charging.

=== Unclaimed remains ===
Coroners are responsible for arranging for the disposal of human remains in cases in which "there is no other person willing to provide for the disposition of the body".

== Related agencies, organizations, and programs ==
=== Death Investigations Account ===
The costs of retaining a forensic pathologist to conduct autopsies ordered by county coroners or medical examiners are reimbursed to counties by the state from the Death Investigations Account, which is held by the Washington State Treasurer. The account is funded from revenue generated by the state's Department of Health; eight dollars of the cost of every certified copy of a record produced by the department is deposited in the account.

=== State Patrol Toxicology Laboratory ===
The Washington State Patrol Toxicology Laboratory, located in Seattle, performs testing on blood and tissue for the presence of drugs and alcohol at the request of coroners and medical examiners. As of the early 2000s, it conducted approximately 650 tests per year as part of coroner or medical examiner death investigations. Established in 1963, the laboratory was accredited by the American Board of Forensic Toxicology in 2005.

=== Washington Association of Coroners and Medical Examiners ===
The Washington Association of Coroners and Medical Examiners is a non-profit, non-governmental organization composed of the state's 39 coroners, medical examiners, and prosecuting attorneys who discharge coroner duties. It facilitates the exchange of information among officials and organizes continuing education courses on topics related to death investigation.

== Reserve assistant coroners ==
In 2001 Kitsap County created a program of "reserve investigative assistant coroners", what was at the time described as the first program of its kind in the state. Under it, citizen volunteers who commit to 80 hours of classroom and field training can be appointed as part-time, unpaid assistant coroners in Kitsap County. Reserve assistant coroners assist deputy coroners in transporting human remains, recovering bodies, and clerical duties. In 2002 the Kitsap County Coroner's Office Reserve Deputy Coroner Program was disbanded. As of 2017, Lewis County had a similar program.

== Accreditation ==
As of 2017, the coroner offices in Cowlitz County, Lewis County, Grant County, and Kitsap County have been accredited by the International Association of Coroners and Medical Examiners. The medical examiner offices of King County, Pierce County, Snohomish County, Spokane County, and Clark County, Washington, have been accredited by the National Association of Medical Examiners (NAME).

The King County Medical Examiner's Office first earned NAME accreditation in 1978; since then, the office has maintained accreditation, making it the longest running accredited Medical Examiner's Office in the United States.
