= International Association of Coroners and Medical Examiners =

- International Association of Coroners and Medical Examiners
- Abbreviation: IAC&ME
- Formation: 1939
- Type: Professional society
- Region served: United States
- Services: Accreditation for coroner and medical examiner offices
- Members: Coroners, Medical Examiners
- Formerly called: National Association of Coroners (until 1969)

The International Association of Coroners and Medical Examiners (IAC&ME) is a United States-based professional society composed primarily of coroners, with a smaller number of members who are medical examiners.

Founded in 1939 as the National Association of Coroners, in 1969 the society changed its name to the International Association of Coroners and Medical Examiners.

The IAC&ME offers accreditation to coroner and medical examiner offices which meet a set of association-defined requirements. The IAC&ME accreditation requirements are essentially identical to those of the National Association of Medical Examiners (NAME), however, unlike NAME the IACME does not require accredited agencies to have on-site autopsy facilities. Once granted, accreditation is valid for five years. As of 2017, 25 coroner and medical examiner offices held accreditations from the IAC&ME.
