= National Museum of Funeral History =

Funerary museum in Houston, Texas

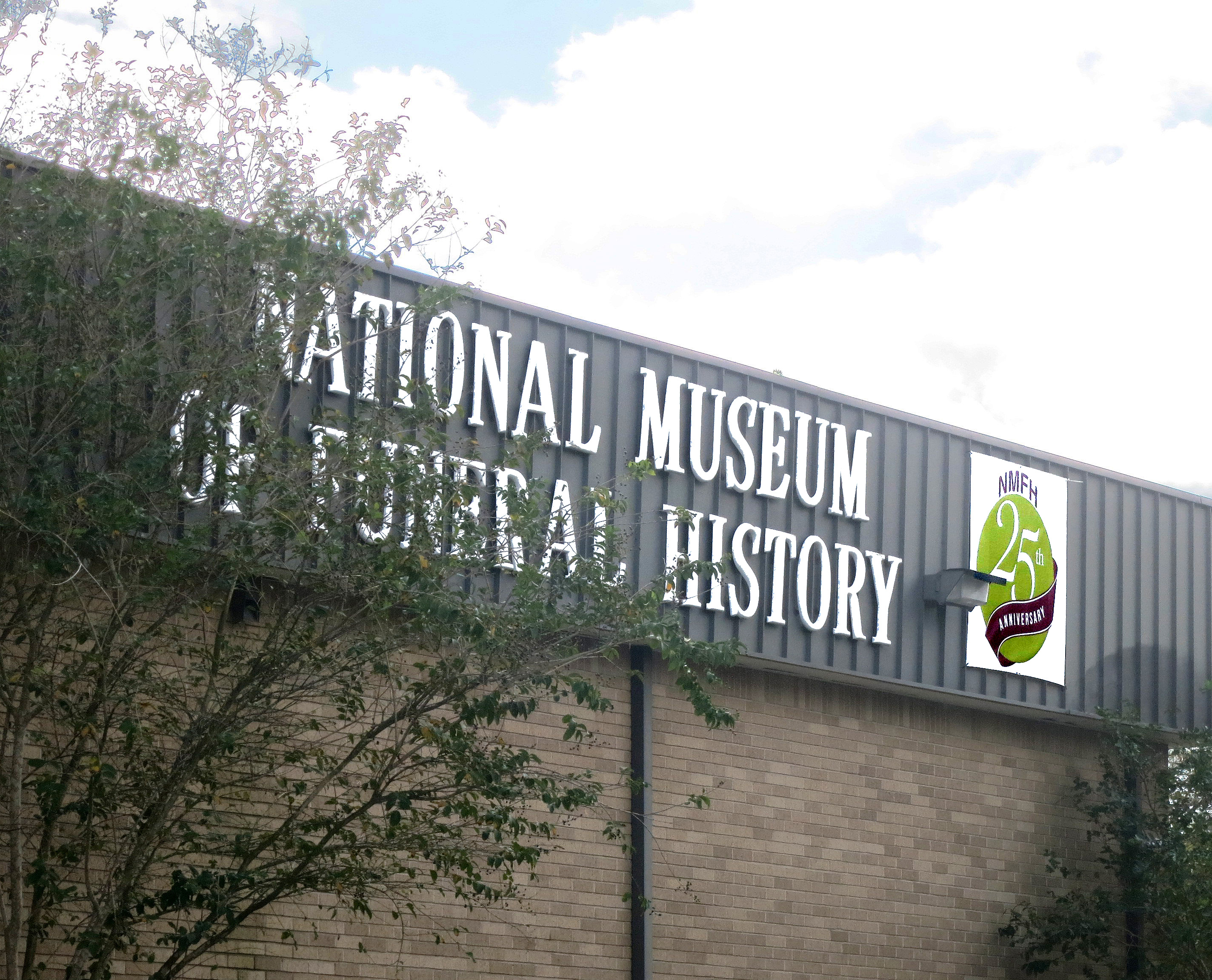
- Established: 1992
- Location: 415 Barren Springs Drive, Houston, TX, US
- Coordinates: 29°59′23.17″N 95°25′50.17″W
- Type: Funerary museum
- Website: www.nmfh.org

The National Museum of Funeral History is a museum in Houston, Texas, that contains a collection of artifacts and relics that aim to "educate the public and preserve the heritage of death care." The 35,000-square-foot museum opened in 1992.

== Features ==
The museum is home to "the country's largest collection of funeral service artifacts and features renowned exhibits on one of man's oldest cultural customs," according to its website. For its hallmark exhibit, Celebrating the Lives and Deaths of the Popes, the museum collaborated with the Vatican to highlight the ceremonies surrounding papal funerals. As of October 2020, the museum has a presidential exhibit, including Abraham Lincoln's death mask. The “National Funeral Museum of Houston” also displays several facts and information about the impact of African-American history on the funeral industry as well as famous African-American people who have died and their impact on the world. The “Nation Funeral Museum of Houston” also displays the customs and traditions created and enacted by the African-American community for when members of their communities pass away. These traditions were originally held in New Orleans, Louisiana, and everyone in the community comes together and honors the deceased.

Displays go back in time as far as Ancient Egyptian funerary practices and include items like hearses and unusual coffins. It also devotes space for a Presidential Funeral Gallery. Among other items, it has the original $99.25 funeral bill for George Washington.
