= Religion in Albania =

Religion in Albania as of the 2023 census conducted by the Institute of Statistics (INSTAT)
1. Sunni Muslim (45.9%)
2. Bektashi Muslim (4.81%)
3. Catholic (8.38%)
4. Eastern Orthodox (7.22%)
5. Evangelical Christian (0.40%)
6. Non-affiliated believers (13.8%)
7. Atheist (3.55%)
8. Undeclared (15.8%)
9. Other (0.15%)

Albania is a religiously diverse secular state with no official religion. The constitution guarantees freedom of religion, belief and conscience.

In the 2023 census, 45.86% of the population identified as Muslim (Mostly Sunni and non-denominal Muslims) and 4.81% as Bektashi, which was recorded separately. Catholics accounted for 8.38%, Eastern Orthodox Christians for 7.22%, and Evangelical Christians for 0.4%. Believers without a religious affiliation accounted for 13.82%, atheists for 3.55%, and other responses for 0.15%. A further 15.76% were recorded as undeclared.

Religious observance in Albania has been described as low. In a 2018 survey by the United Nations Development Programme (UNDP), 62.7% of respondents said they did not actively practice religion, while 37.3% said they did.

Albania has been a secular state since 1912 and thus and currently according to the constitution, the state has to be "neutral in questions of belief and conscience": The former socialist government started the anti-religious campaign in 1967 and declared Albania the world's first constitutionally "atheist state" in 1976 in which believers faced harsh punishments, and many clergymen were killed. Nowadays religious observance and practice is generally lax, and polls have shown that, compared to the populations of other countries, few Albanians consider religion to be a dominant factor in their lives. When asked about religion, people generally refer to their family's historical religious legacy and not to their own choice of faith.

== History ==
=== Antiquity ===
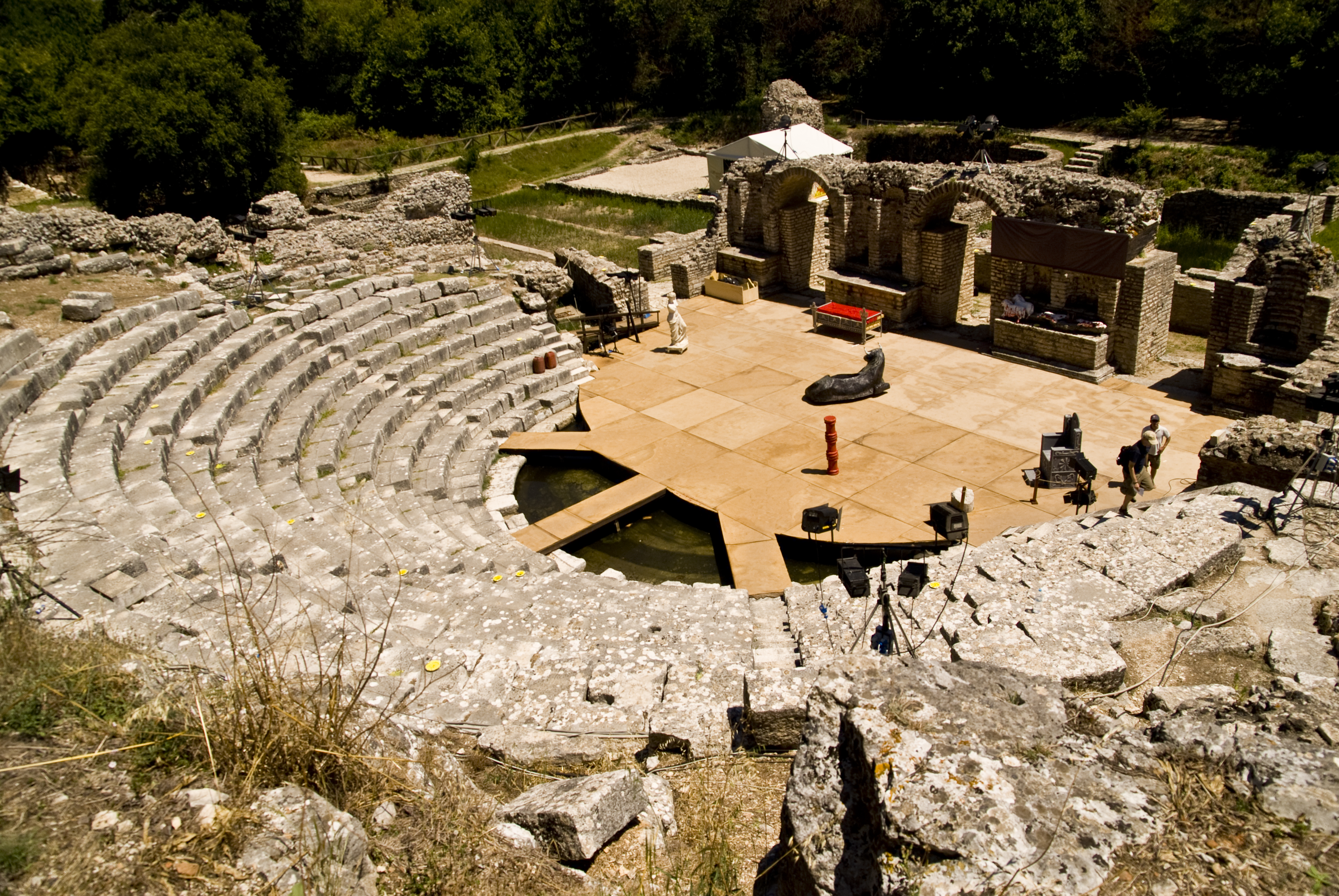
In the late Roman era, Christianity was preached in theaters like this one in Butrint

Christianity spread to urban centers in the region of Albania, at the time composed mostly Epirus Nova and part of south Illyricum, during the later period of Roman era and reached the region relatively early. St. Paul preached the Gospel 'even unto Illyricum' (Romans 15:19). Schnabel asserts that Paul probably preached in Shkodra and Durrës. The steady growth of the Christian community in Dyrrhachium (the Roman name for Epidamnus) led to the creation of a local bishopric in 58 AD. Later, episcopal seats were established in Apollonia, Buthrotum (modern Butrint), and Scodra (modern Shkodra).

One notable Martyr was Saint Astius, who was Bishop of Dyrrachium, who was crucified during the persecution of Christians by the Roman Emperor Trajan. Saint Eleutherius (not to be confused with the later Saint-Pope) was bishop of Messina and Illyria. He was martyred along with his mother Anthia during the anti-Christian campaign of Hadrian.

From the 2nd to the 4th centuries, the main language used to spread the Christian religion was Latin, whereas in the 4th to the 5th centuries it was Greek in Epirus and Macedonia and Latin in Praevalitana and Dardania. Christianity spread to the region during the 4th century, however the Bible cites in Romans that Christianity was spread in the first century. The following centuries saw the erection of characteristic examples of Byzantine architecture such as the churches in Kosine, Mborje and Apollonia.

Christian bishops from what would later become eastern Albania took part in the First Council of Nicaea. Arianism had at that point extended to Illyria, where Arius himself had been exiled to by Constantine.

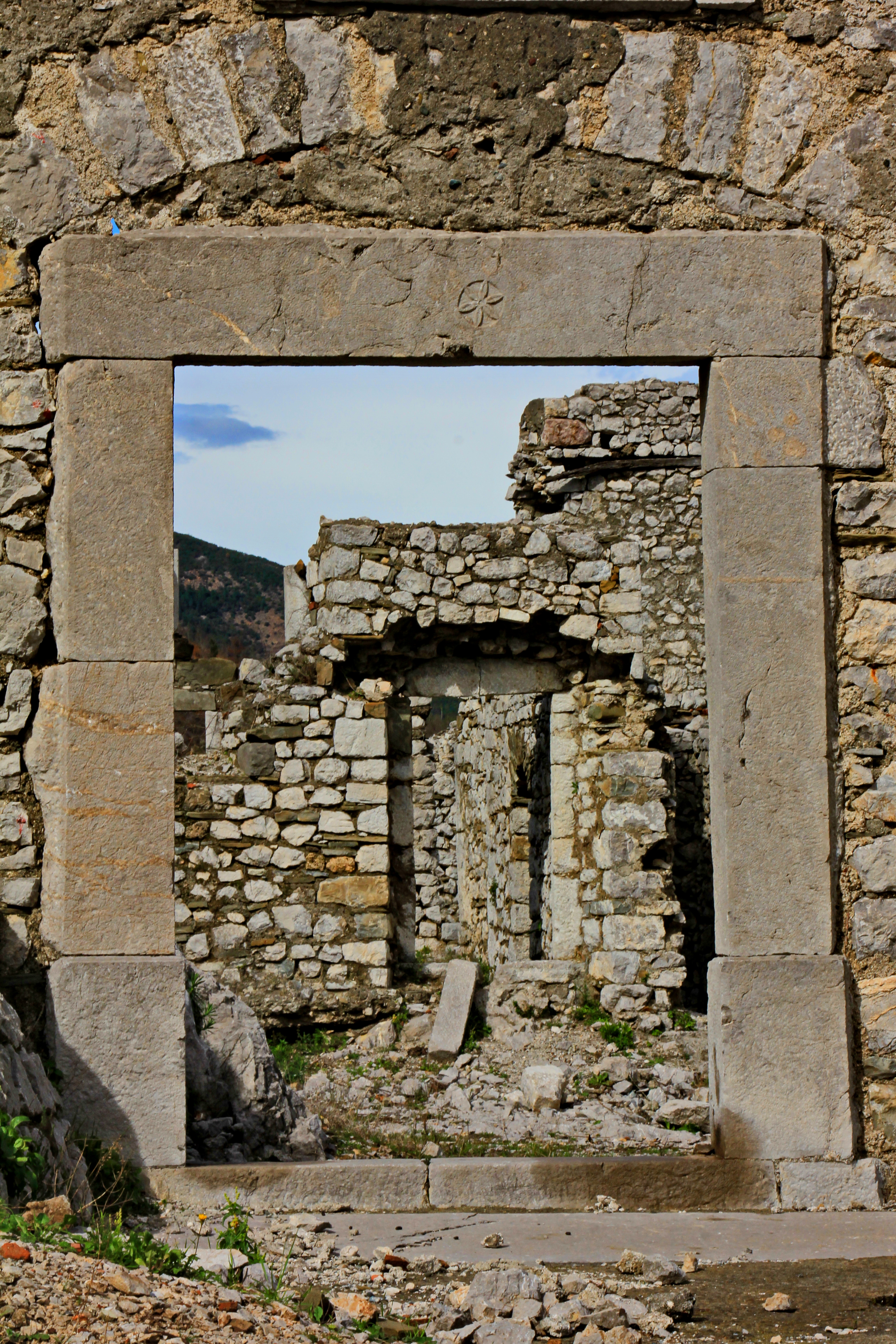
Ruins of a 12th-century medieval Catholic Church in Rubik

=== Middle Ages ===
Since the early 4th century AD, Christianity had become the established religion in the Roman Empire, supplanting pagan polytheism and eclipsing for the most part the humanistic world outlook and institutions inherited from the Greek and Roman civilizations. Ecclesiastical records during the Slavic invasions are slim. Though the country was in the fold of Byzantium, Christians in the region remained under the jurisdiction of the Roman pope until 732. In that year the iconoclast Byzantine emperor Leo III, angered by archbishops of the region because they had supported Rome in the Iconoclastic Controversy, detached the church of the province from the Roman pope and placed it under the patriarch of Constantinople. When the East-West schism separated the Western Christianity from Greek Christianity, southern Albanian regions retained their ties to Constantinople while the northern areas reverted to the jurisdiction of Rome.

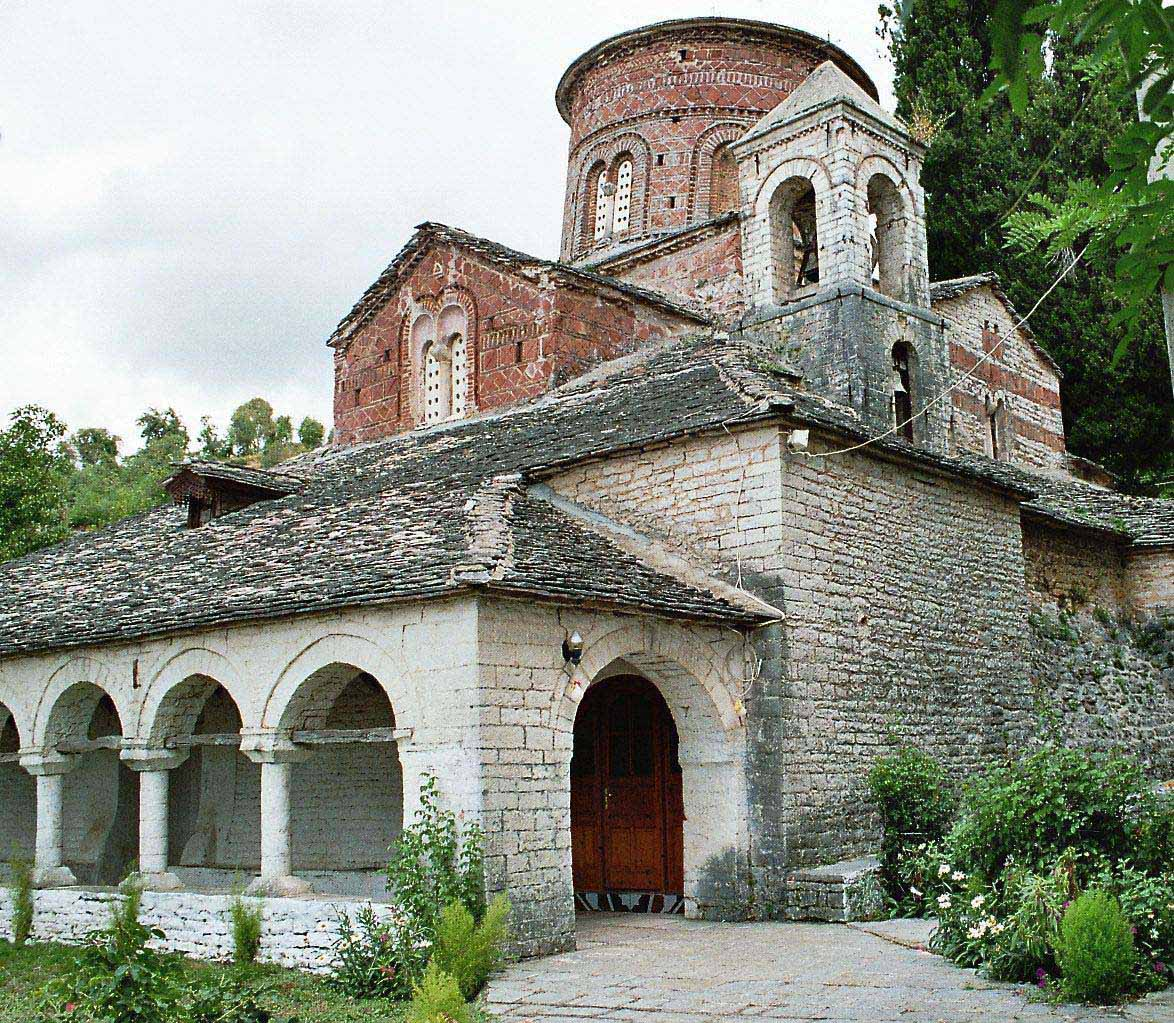
The 12th-century Eastern Orthodox Church in Labova e Kryqit

The Albanians first appear in the historical record in Byzantine sources of the 11th century. At this point, they are already fully Christianized. Most Albanian regions belonged to the Eastern Orthodox Church after the schism, but regional Albanian populations gradually became Catholic to secure their independence from various Orthodox political entities and conversions to Catholicism would be especially notable under the aegis of the Kingdom of Albania. Flirtations with conversions to Catholicism in Central Albanian Principality of Arbanon are reported in the later 12th century, but until 1204 Central and Southern Albanians (in Epirus Nova) remained mostly Orthodox despite the growing Catholic influence in the north and were often linked to Byzantine and Bulgarian state entities Krujë, however, became an important center for the spread of Catholicism. Its bishopric had been Catholic since 1167. It was under direct dependence from the pope and it was the pope himself who consecrated the bishop. Local Albanian nobles maintained good relations with the Papacy. Its influence became so great, that it began to nominate local bishops. The Archbishopric of Durrës, one of the primary bishoprics in Albania had initially remained under the authority of Eastern Orthodox Church after the split despite continuous, but fruitless efforts from Rome to convert it to the Latin Church.

==== After the Fourth Crusade ====
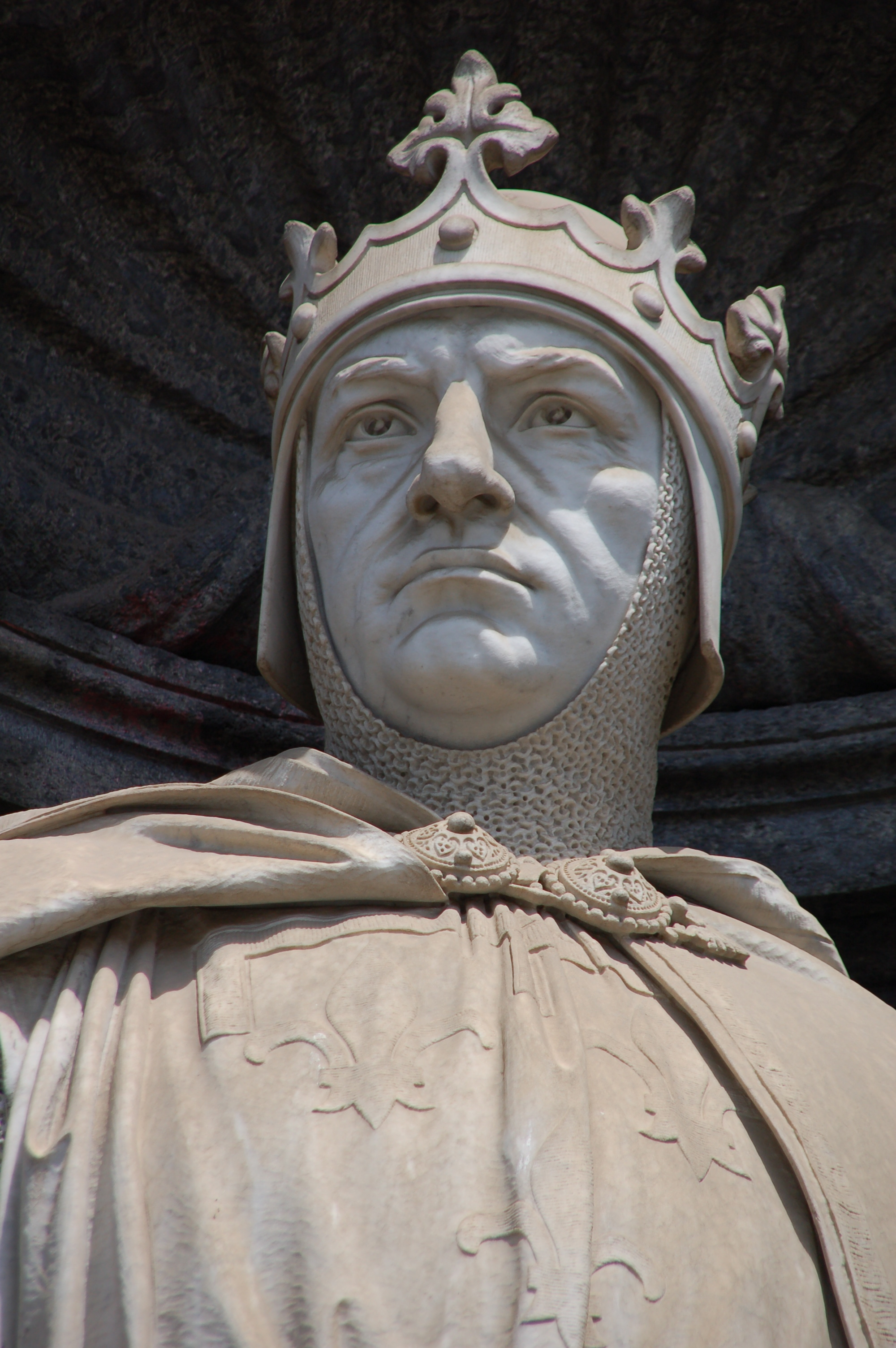
Charles I established Regnum Albaniae, officially Catholic

However, things changed after the fall of Byzantine Empire in 1204. In 1208, a Catholic archdeacon was elected for the archbishopric of Durrës. After the reconquest of Durrës by the Despotate of Epirus in 1214, the Latin Archbishop of Durrës was replaced by an Orthodox archbishop. According to Etleva Lala, on the edge of the Albanian line in the north was Prizren, which was also an Orthodox bishopric albeit with some Catholic parochial churches, in 1372 received a Catholic bishop due to close relations between the Balsha family and the Papacy.

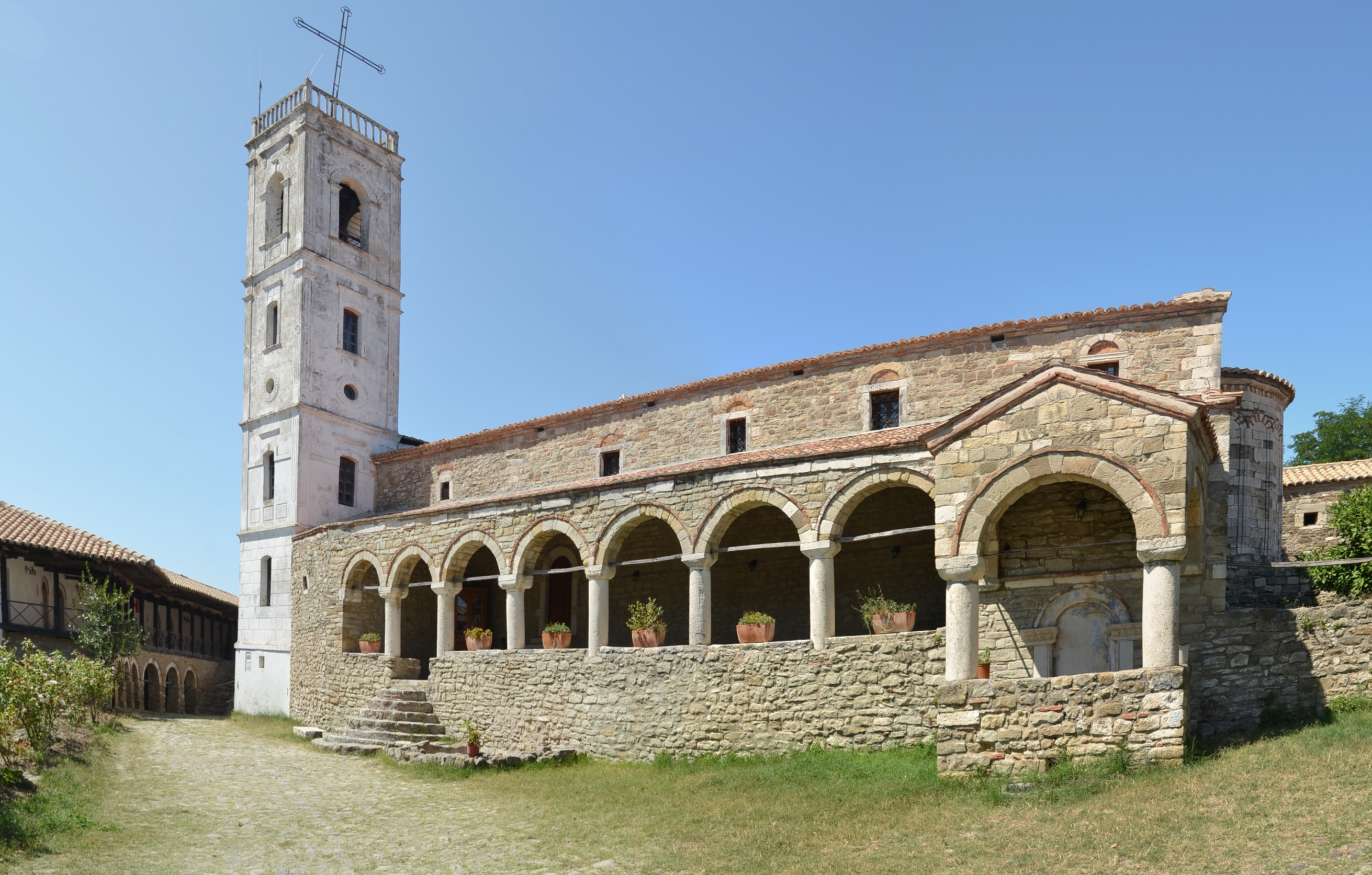
Ardenica Monastery, built by the Byzantines after a military victory

After the Fourth Crusade, a new wave of Catholic dioceses, churches and monasteries were founded, a number of different religious orders began spreading into the country, and papal missionaries traversed its territories. Those who were not Catholic in Central and North Albania converted and a great number of Albanian clerics and monks were present in the Dalmatian Catholic institutions. The creation of the Kingdom of Albania in 1272, with links to and influence from Western Europe, meant that a decidedly Catholic political structure had emerged, facilitating the further spread of Catholicism in the Balkans. Durrës became again a Catholic archbishopric in 1272. Other territories of the Kingdom of Albania became Catholic centers as well. Butrint in the south, although dependent on Corfu, became Catholic and remained as such during the 14th century. The bishopric of Vlore also converted immediately following the founding of the Kingdom of Albania. Around 30 Catholic churches and monasteries were built during the rule of Helen of Anjou, as Queen consort of the Serbian Kingdom, in North Albania and in Serbia. New bishoprics were created especially in North Albania, with the help of Helen. As Catholic power in the Balkans expanded with Albania as a stronghold, Catholic structures began appearing as far afield as Skopje (which was a mostly Serbian Orthodoxy city at the time) in 1326, with the election of the local bishop there being presided upon by the Pope himself; in the following year, 1327, Skopje sees a Dominican appointed.

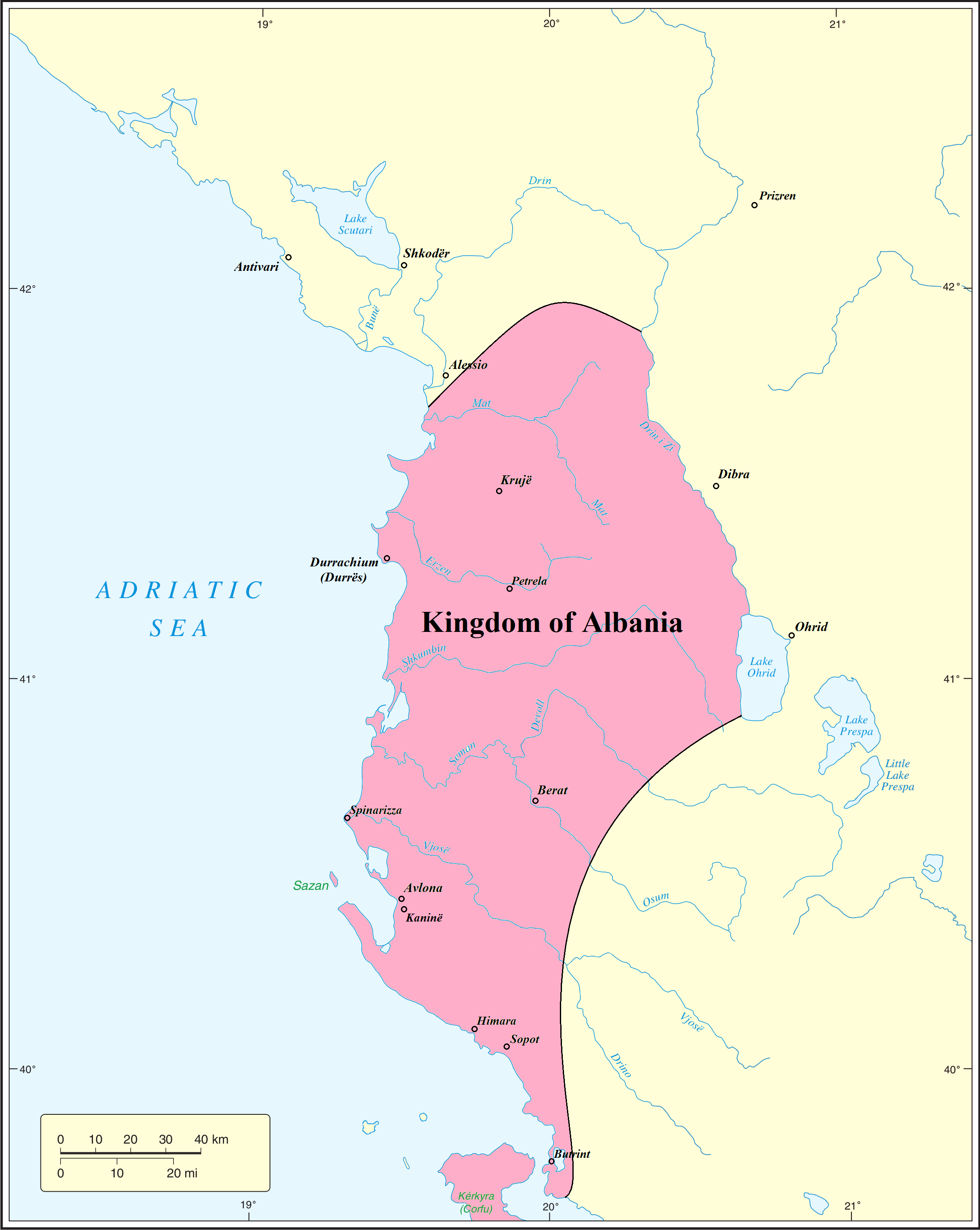
Regnum Albaniae, the Kingdom of Albania

However, in Durrës the Byzantine Rite continued to exist for a while after Angevin conquest. This double-line of authority created some confusion in the local population and a contemporary visitor of the country described Albanians as nor they are entirely Catholic or entirely schismatic. In order to fight this religious ambiguity, in 1304, Dominicans were ordered by Pope Benedict XI to enter the country and to instruct the locals in the Latin liturgical rites. Dominican priests were also ordered as bishops in Vlorë and Butrint.

In 1332 a Dominican priest reported that within the Kingdom of Rascia (Serbia) there were two Catholic peoples, the "Latins" and the "Albanians", who both had their own language. The former was limited to coastal towns while the latter was spread out over the countryside, and while the language of the Albanians was noted as quite different from Latin, both peoples are noted as writing with Latin letters. The author, an anonymous Dominican priest, writing in favor of a Western Catholic military action to expel Orthodox Serbia from areas of Albania it controlled in order to restore the power of the Catholic church there, argued that the Albanians and Latin and their clerics were suffering under the "extremely dire bondage of their odious Slav leaders whom they detest" and would eagerly support an expedition of " one thousand French knights and five or six thousand foot soldiers" who, with, their help, could throw off the rule of Rascia.

Although Serbian rulers at earlier times had at times relations with the Catholic West despite being Orthodox, as a counterbalance to Byzantine power, and therefore tolerated the spread of Catholicism in their lands, under the reign of Stefan Dušan the Catholics were persecuted, as were also Orthodox bishops loyal to Constantinople. The Catholic rite was called Latin heresy and, angered in part by marriages of Serbian Orthodox with "half-believers" and the Catholic proselytization of Serbians, Dušan's Code, the Zakonik contained harsh measures against them. However, the persecutions of local Catholics did not begin in 1349 when the Code was declared in Skopje, but much earlier, at least since the beginning of the 14th century. Under these circumstances the relations between local Catholic Albanians and the papal curia became very close, while the previously friendly relations between local Catholics and Serbians deteriorated significantly.

Between 1350 and 1370, the spread of Catholicism in Albania reached its peak. At that period there were around seventeen Catholic bishoprics in the country, which acted not only as centers for Catholic reform within Albania, but also as centers for missionary activity in the neighboring areas, with the permission of the pope. At the end of the 14th century, the previously Orthodox Autocephalous Archbishopric of Ohrid was dismantled in favor of the Catholic rite.

=== Renaissance ===
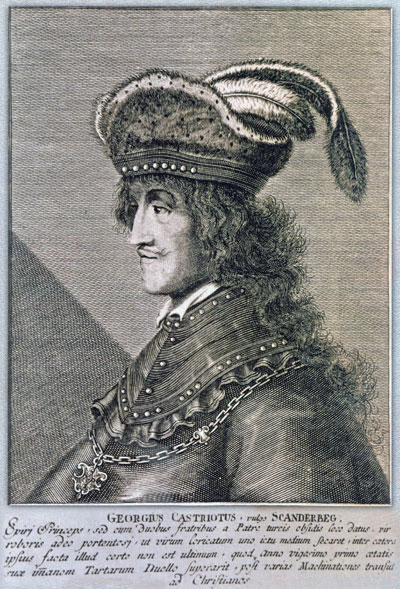
Gjergj Kastrioti Skanderbeg, an Albanian noble who converted to Islam while a boy in the Ottoman court, then converted again to Christianity as he launched a resistance against the Ottomans that lasted decades

Christianity was later overshadowed by Islam, which became the predominant religion during the invasion from the Ottoman Empire from the 15th century until the year 1912. Many Albanians embraced Islam in different ways.

Albania differs from other regions in the Balkans in that the peak of Islamization in Albania occurred much later: 16th century Ottoman census data showed that sanjaks where Albanians lived remained overwhelmingly Christian with Muslims making up no more than 5% in most areas (Ohrid 1.9%, Shkodra 4.5%, Elbasan 5.5%, Vlora 1.8%, Dukagjin 0%) while during this period Muslims had already risen to large proportions in Bosnia (Bosnia 46%, Herzegovina 43%, urban Sarajevo 100%), Northern Greece (Trikala 17.5%), North Macedonia (Skopje and Bitola both at 75%) and Eastern Bulgaria (Silistra 72%, Chirmen 88%, Nikopol 22%). Later on, in the 19th century, when the process of Islamization had halted in most of the Balkans and some Balkan Christian peoples like Greeks and Serbs had already claimed independence, Islamization continued to make significant progress in Albania, especially in the South.

As a rule, Ottoman rule largely tolerated Christian subjects but it also discriminated against them, turning them into second-class citizens with much higher taxes and various legal restrictions like being unable to take Muslims to court, have horses, have weapons, or have houses overlooking those of Muslims. While Catholicism was chronically held in suspicion by Ottoman authorities, after the conquest of Constantinople, the Ottomans largely allowed the Orthodox church to function unhindered, except during periods when the church was considered politically suspect and thus suppressed with expulsions of bishops and seizure of property and revenues. Conversion during Ottoman times was variously due to calculated attempts to improve social and economic status, due to the successful proselytizing by missionaries, or done out of desperation in very difficult times; in the latter case, the converts often practised crypto-Christianity for long periods. During the Ottoman period, most Christians as well as most Muslims employed a degree of syncretism, still practising various pagan rites; many of these rites are best preserved among mystical orders like the Bektashi.

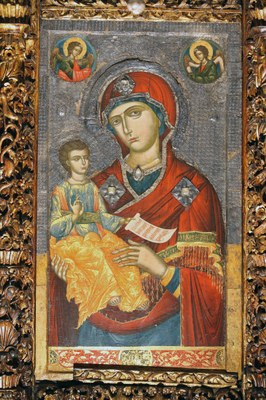
Fresco from 16th century Berat

Unlike some other areas of the Balkans, such as Bulgaria and Bosnia, for the first couple centuries of Ottoman rule, up until the 1500s, Islam remained confined to members of the co-opted aristocracy and a couple scattered military settlements of Yuruks from Anatolia, while the native Albanian peasantry remained overwhelmingly Christian. Even long after the fall of Skanderbeg, large regions of the Albanian countryside frequently rebelled against Ottoman rule, often incurring large human costs, including the decimation of whole villages. In the 1570s, a concerted effort by Ottoman rulers to convert the native population to Islam in order to stop the occurrence of seasonal rebellions began in Elbasan and Reka. In 1594, the Pope incited a failed rebellion among Catholic Albanians in the north, promising help from Spain. However the assistance did not come, and when the rebellion was crushed in 1596, Ottoman repression and heavy pressures to convert to Islam were implemented to punish the rebels.

Between 1500 and 1800, impressive ecclesiastical art flourished across Southern Albania. In Moscopole there were over 23 churches during the city's period of prosperity in the mid 18th century. Post-Byzantine architectural style is prevalent in the region, e.g. in Vithkuq, Labove, Mesopotam, Dropull.

=== Christianity and Islam in the north under Ottoman Rule ===
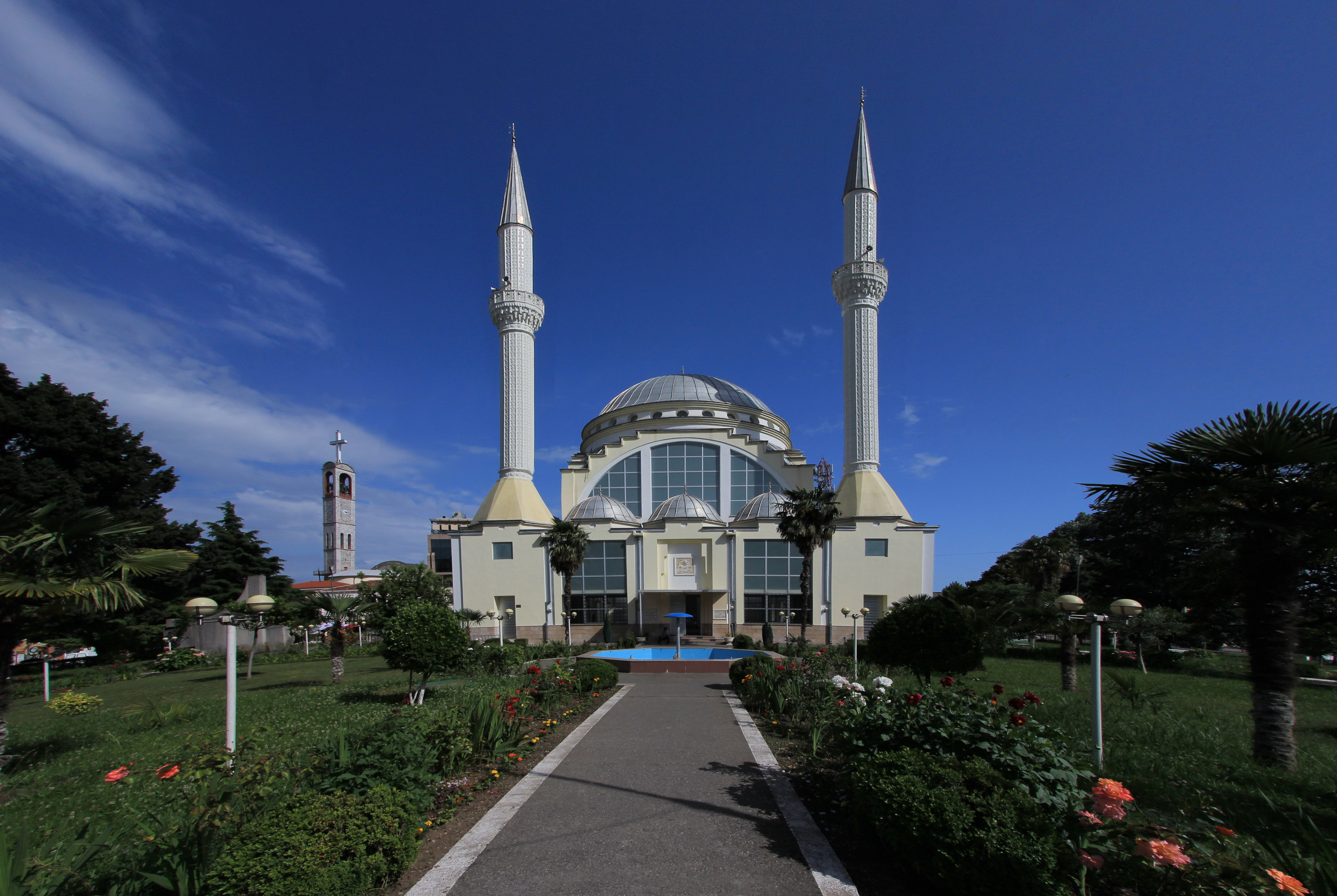
Shkodër's Ebu Beker Mosque, which was a center of learning

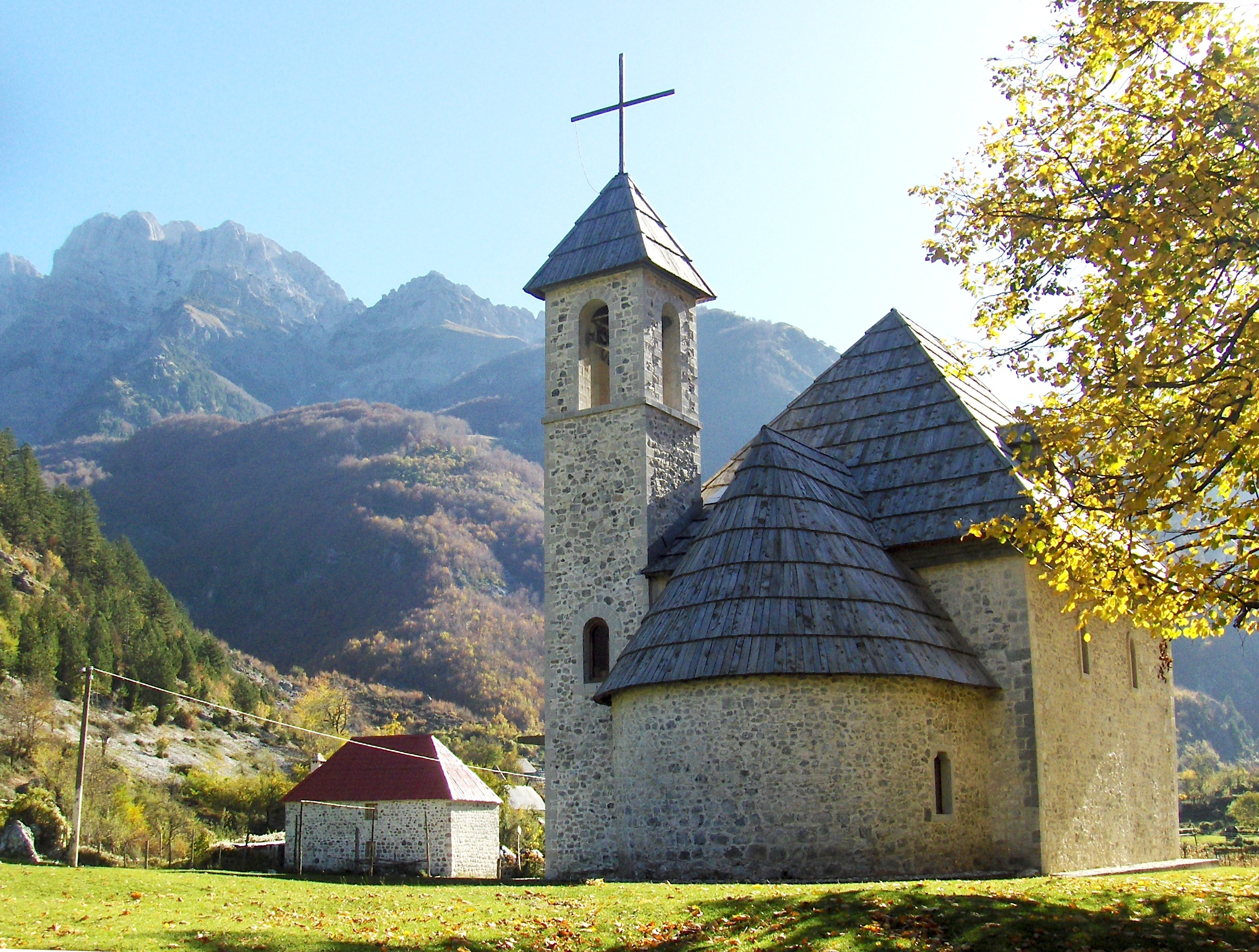
Highland Church in Theth, a town founded by Catholics to preserve their faith during a time of pressures

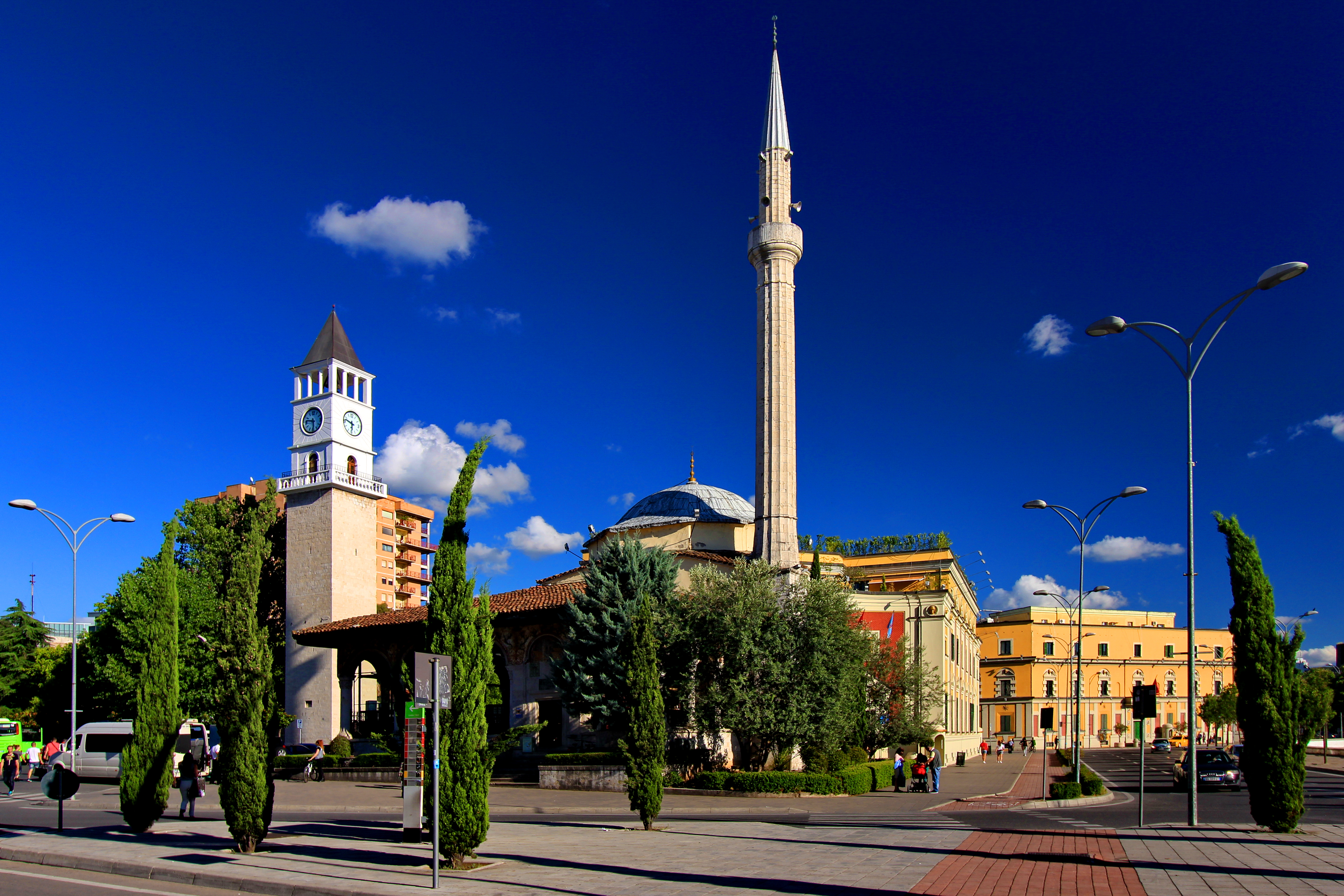
Ethem Bey Mosque in Tirana, built in the 18th century

Ramadan Marmullaku noted that, in the 1600s, the Ottomans organized a concerted campaign of Islamization that was not typically applied elsewhere in the Balkans, in order to ensure the loyalty of the rebellious Albanian population. Although there were certain instances of violently forced conversion, usually this was achieved through debatably coercive economic incentives – in particular, the head tax on Christians was drastically increased. While the tax levied on Albanian Christians in the 1500s amounted to about 45 akçes, in the mid-1600s, it was 780 akçes. Conversion to Islam here was also aided by the dire state of the Catholic church in the period— in the entirety of Albania, there were only 130 Catholic priests, many of these poorly educated. During this period, many Christian Albanians fled into the mountains to found new villages like Theth, or to other countries where they contributed to the emergence of Arvanites, Arbëreshë, and Arbanasi communities in Greece, Italy, and Croatia. While in the first decade of the 17th century, Central and Northern Albania remained firmly Catholic (according to Vatican reports, Muslims were no more than 10% in Northern Albania), by the middle of the 17th century, 30–50% of Northern Albania had converted to Islam, while by 1634 most of Kosovo had also converted. During this time, the Venetian Republic helped to prevent the wholesale Islamisation of Albania, maintaining a hold on parts of the north near the coast.

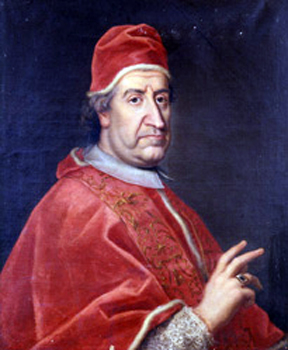
Pope Clement XI was the Pope from 1700 to 1721. He was born to the noble family of Albani of Italian and Albanian origin, and convened the Kuvendi i Arbënit to halt the wave of de-Catholicisation

This period also saw the emergence of Albanian literature, written by Christians such as Pjetër Bogdani. Some of these Christian Albanian thinkers, like Bogdani himself, ultimately advocated for an Albania outside of Ottoman control, and at the end of the 17th century, Bogdani and his colleague Raspasani, raised an army of thousands of Kosovar Albanians in support of the Austrians in the Great Turkish War. However, when this effort failed to expel Ottoman rule from the area yet again, many of Kosovo's Catholics fled to Hungary.

In 1700, the Papacy passed to Pope Clement XI, who was himself of Albanian-Italian origins and held great interest in the welfare of his Catholic Albanian kinsmen, known for composing the Illyricum sacrum. In 1703 he convened the Albanian Council (Kuvendi i Arbënit) in order to organize methods to prevent further apostasy in Albania, and preserve the existence of Catholicism in the land. The widespread survival of Catholicism in northern Albania is largely attributable to the activity of the Franciscan order in the area

In addition to Catholicism and Sunni Islam, there were pockets of Orthodox (some of whom had converted from Catholicism) in Kavajë, Durrës, Upper Reka and some other regions, while Bektashis became established in Kruja, Luma, Bulqiza, Tetova, and Gjakova. Especially in the tribal regions of the north, religious differences were often mitigated by common cultural and tribal characteristics, as well as knowledge of family lineages connecting Albanian Christians and Albanian Muslims. In the 17th century, although many of the rebellions of the century were at least in part motivated by Christian sentiment, it was noted that many Albanian Muslims also took part, and that, despising Ottoman rule no less than their Christian brethren, Albanian Muslims would revolt eagerly if only given the slightest assistance from the Catholic West.

=== Christianity and Islam in the South under Ottoman Rule ===
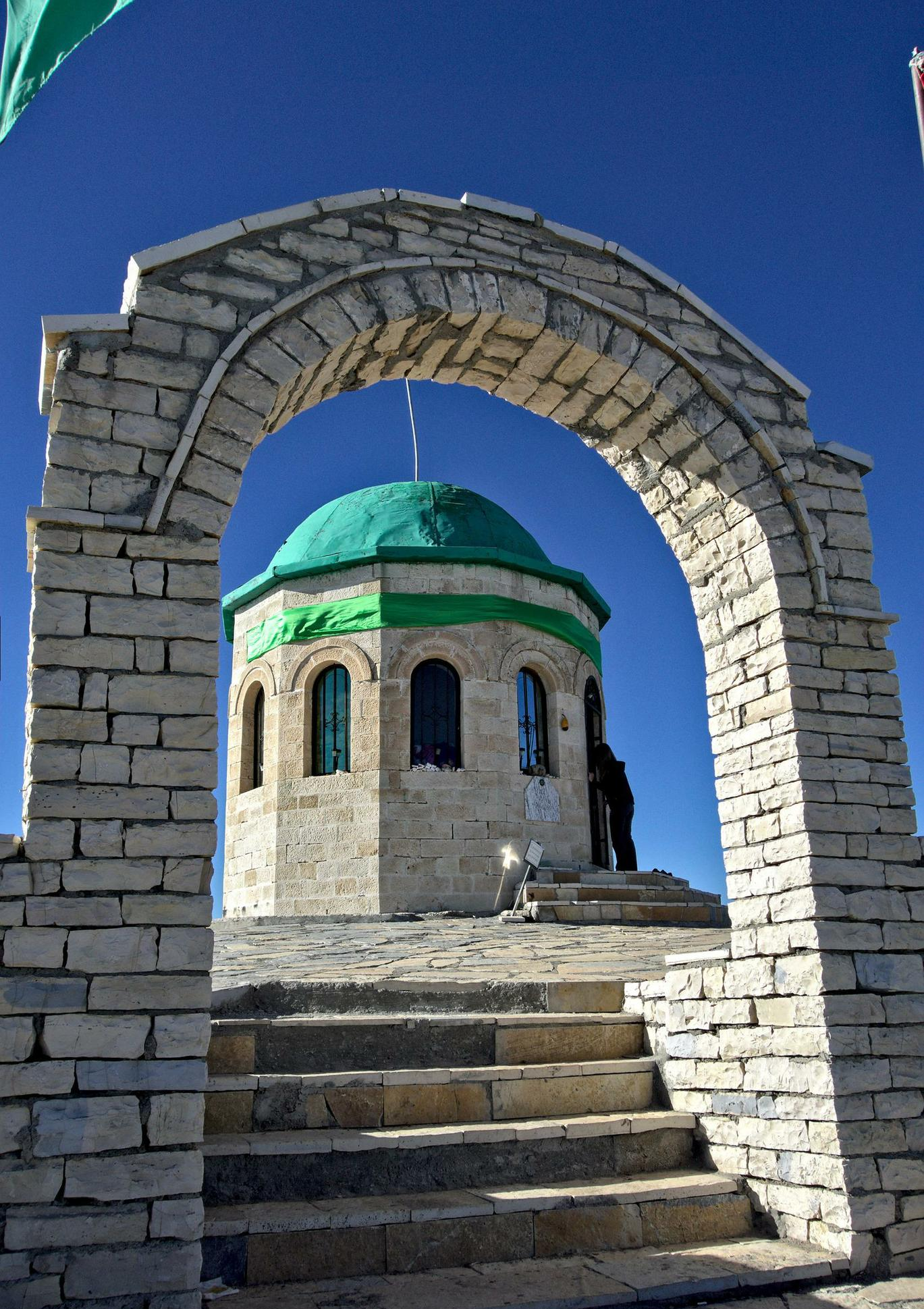
Bektashi tyrbe at the top of Mount Tomorr

In the late 17th and 18th centuries, especially after numerous rebellions including during the Great Turkish War and subsequent clashes with Orthodox Russia, Ottoman rulers also made concerted efforts to convert the Orthodox Albanians of Southern and Central Albania (as well as neighboring regions of Greece and Macedonia). Like in the north, conversion was achieved through a diverse motley of violent, coercive and non-coercive means, but raised taxes were the main factor. Nevertheless, there were specific local cases: in Vlora and the surrounding region, the Christians converted en masse once the area was recaptured from the Christian forces in 1590, because they feared violent retribution for their collaboration. In Labëri, meanwhile, mass conversion took place during a famine in which the bishop of Himara and Delvina was said to have forbidden the people from breaking the fast and consuming milk under threat of interminable hell. Across Orthodox regions of Albania, conversion was also helped by the presence of heresies like Arianism and the fact that much of the Orthodox clergy was illiterate, corrupt, and conducted sermons in Greek, a foreign language, as well as the poverty of the Orthodox church. The clergy, largely from the Bosphorus, was distant from its Albanian flocks and also corrupt as well, abusing church tax collection and exacting a heavy tax regime that aggregated on top of punitive taxes imposed directly by the Ottoman state on the rebellious Albanian Christian population aimed at sparking their conversion.

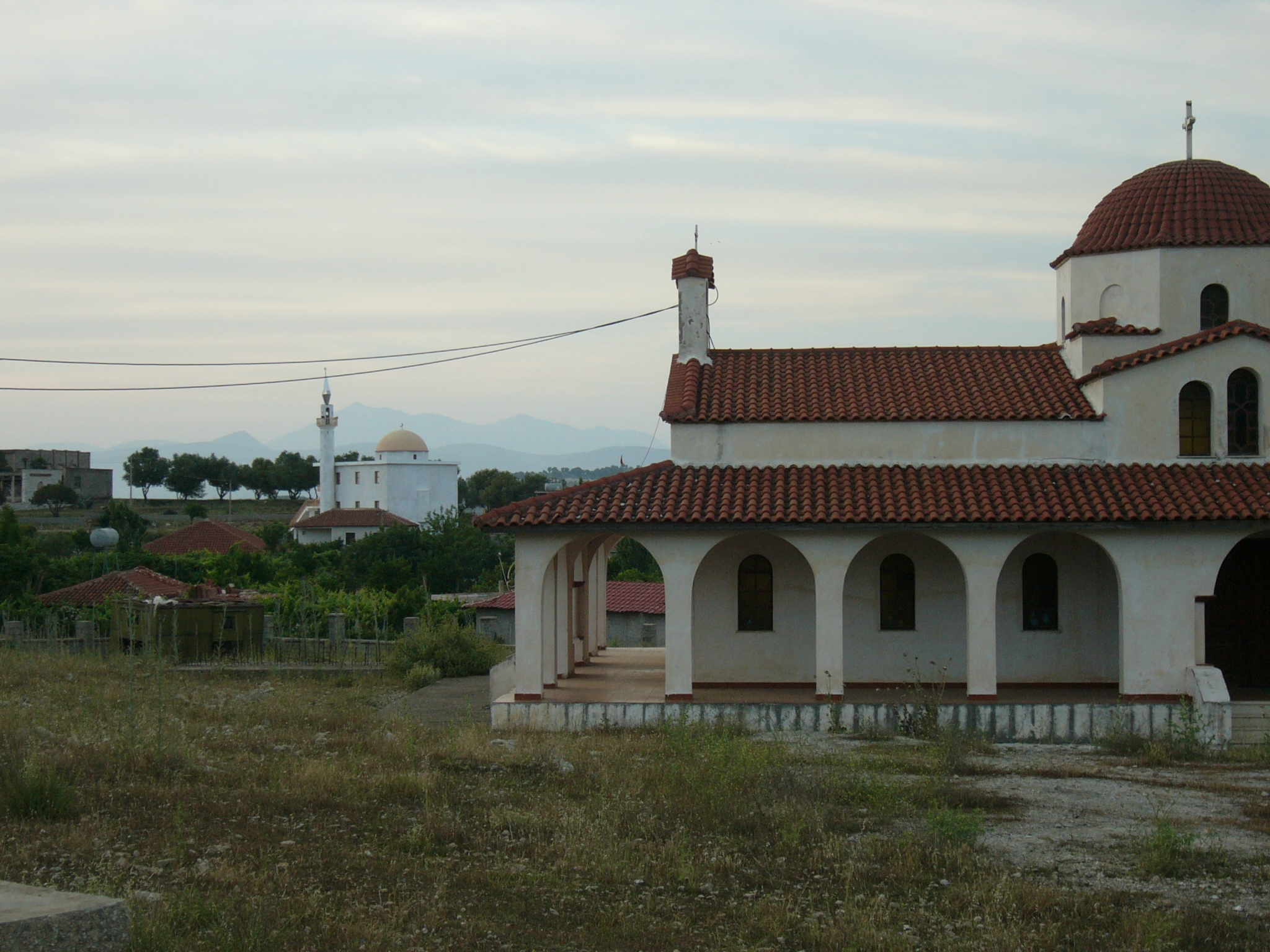
Rural church and mosque

Orthodox areas further north, such as those around Elbasan, were first to convert, during the 1700s, passing through a stage of Crypto-Christianity although in these regions scattered Orthodox holdouts remained (such as around Berat, in Zavalina, and the quite large region of Myzeqe including Fier and Lushnjë) as well as continuing Crypto-Christianity around the region of Shpati among others, where Crypto-Christians formally reverted to Orthodoxy in 1897. Further south, progress was slower. The region of Gjirokastra did not become majority Muslim until around 1875, and even then most Muslims were concentrated in the city of Gjirokastra itself. The same trajectory was true of Albanians in Chamëria, with the majority of Cham Albanians remaining Orthodox until around 1875— at which point Ottoman rule in the Balkans was already collapsing and many Christian Balkan states had already claimed independence (Greece, Serbia, Romania).

At the end of the Ottoman period, Sunni Islam held a slight majority (or plurality) in the Albanian territories. Catholicism still prevailed in the northwestern regions surrounding Lezha and Shkodra, as well as a few pockets in Kosovo in and around Gjakova, Peja, Vitina, Prizren and Klina. Orthodoxy remained prevalent in various pockets of Southern and Central Albania (Myzeqeja, Zavalina, Shpati as well as large parts of what are now the counties of Vlorë, Gjirokastë and Korçë). The syncretic Bektashi sect, meanwhile, gained adherence across large parts of the South, especially Skrapari and Dishnica where it is the overwhelming majority. This four-way division of Albanians between Sunnis (who became either a plurality or a majority), Orthodox, Bektashis and Catholics, with the later emergence of Albanian Uniates, Protestants and atheists, prevented Albanian nationalism as it emerged from tying itself to any particular faith, instead promoting harmony between the different confessions and using the shared Albanian language, Albanian history and Albanian ethnic customs as unifying themes. Despite this, Bektashi tekkes in the south and Catholic churches in the north were both used by the nationalist movement as places of dissemination of nationalist ideals.

=== Independence ===
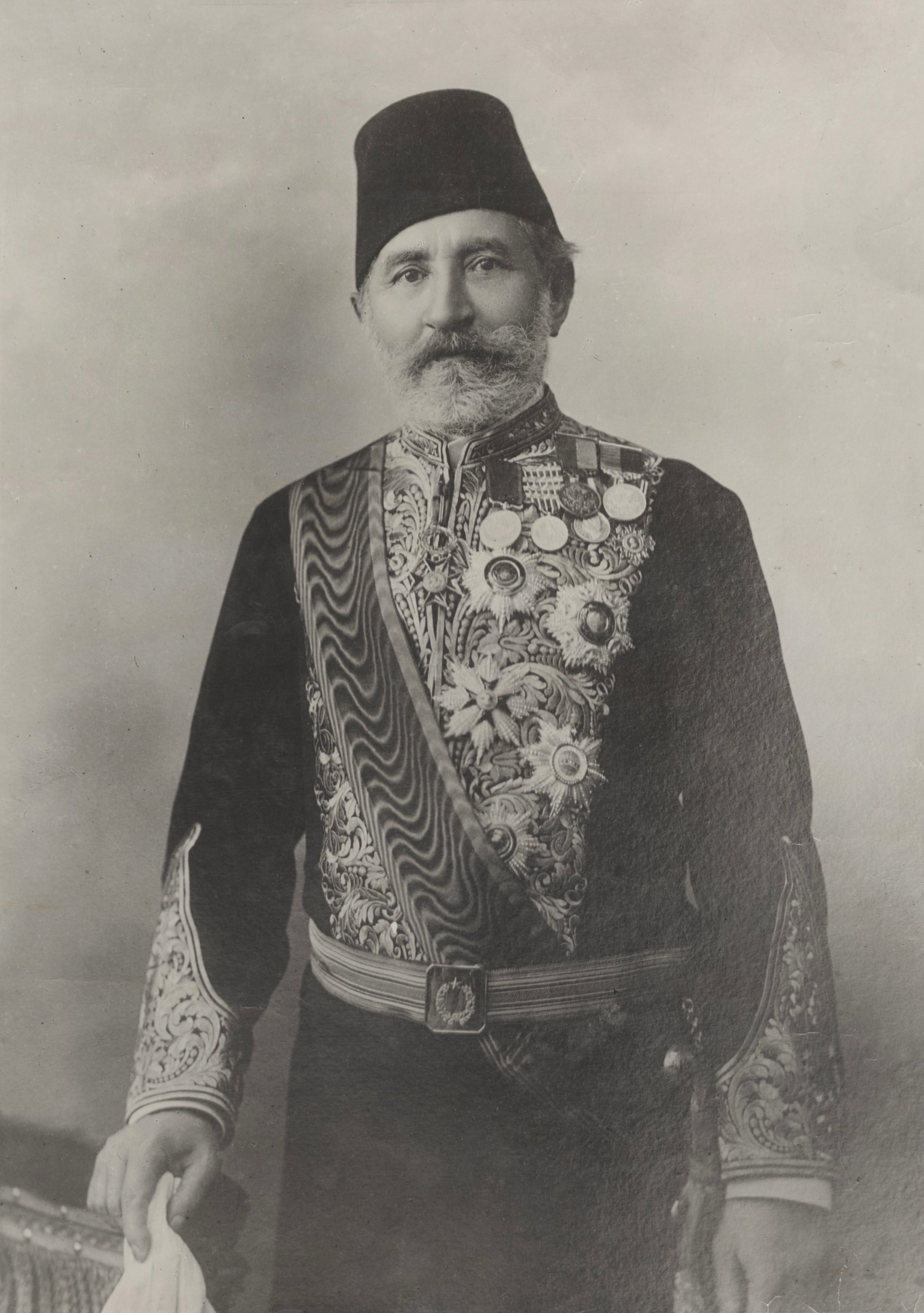
Pashko Vasa, Albanian Catholic governor of Lebanon, advocated interfaith unity among Albanians for the national cause

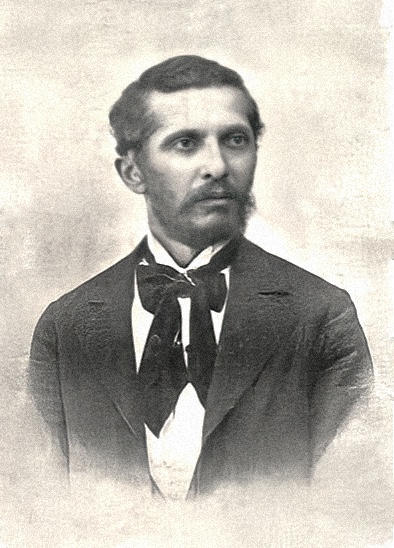
Naim Frashëri convinced Bektashi leaders to support Albanianism and to act as a bridge between Christians and Muslims

During the 20th century after Independence (1912) the democratic, monarchic and later the totalitarian regimes followed a systematic dereligionization of the nation and the national culture. Albania never had an official state religion either as a republic or as a kingdom after its restoration in 1912. Religious tolerance in Albania was born of national expediency and a general lack of religious convictions.

=== Monarchy ===
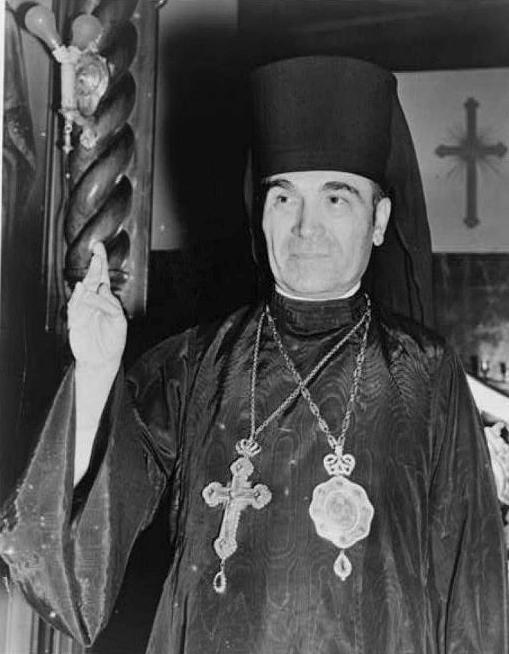
Bishop Fan Noli, founded the Orthodox Autocephalous Church of Albania

Originally under the monarchy, institutions of all confessions were put under state control. In 1923, following the government program, the Albanian Muslim congress convened at Tirana decided to break with the Caliphate, established a new form of prayer (standing, instead of the traditional salah ritual), banished polygamy and did away with the mandatory use of veil (hijab) by women in public, which had been forced on the urban population by the Ottomans during the occupation.

In 1929 the Albanian Orthodox Church was declared autocephalous.

A year later, in 1930, the first official religious census was carried out. Reiterating conventional Ottoman data from a century earlier which previously covered double the new state's territory and population, 50% of the population was grouped as Sunni Muslim, 20% as Orthodox Christian, 20% as Bektashi Muslim and 10% as Catholic Christian.

The monarchy was determined that religion should no longer be a foreign-oriented master dividing the Albanians, but a nationalized servant uniting them. It was at this time that newspaper editorials began to disparage the almost universal adoption of Muslim and Christian names, suggesting instead that children be given neutral Albanian names.

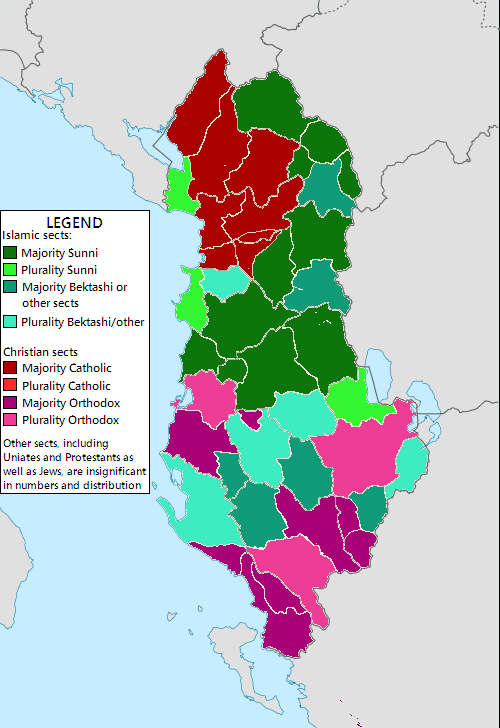
Approximate distribution of religions in Albania in the early 1900s, based on the 1908 Ottoman census and the 1918 Albanian census.

Official slogans began to appear everywhere. "Religion separates, patriotism unites." "We are no longer Muslim, Orthodox, Catholic, we are all Albanians." "Our religion is Albanism." The national hymn characterized neither Muhammad nor Jesus Christ, but King Zogu as "Shpëtimtari i Atdheut" (Savior of the Fatherland). The hymn to the flag honored the soldier dying for his country as a "Saint." Increasingly the mosque and the church were expected to function as servants of the state, the patriotic clergy of all faiths preaching the gospel of Albanism.

Monarchy stipulated that the state should be neutral, with no official religion and that the free exercise of religion should be extended to all faiths. Neither in government nor in the school system should favor be shown to any one faith over another. Albanism was substituted for religion, and officials and schoolteachers were called "apostles" and "missionaries." Albania's sacred symbols were no longer the cross and the crescent, but the Flag and the King. Hymns idealizing the nation, Skanderbeg, war heroes, the king and the flag predominated in public-school music classes to the exclusion of virtually every other theme.

The first reading lesson in elementary schools introduced a patriotic catechism beginning with this sentence, "I am an Albanian. My country is Albania." Then there follows in poetic form, "But man himself, what does he love in life?" "He loves his country." "Where does he live with hope? Where does he want to die?" "In his country." "Where may he be happy, and live with honor?" "In Albania."

=== Italian occupation ===
On 7 April 1939, Albania was invaded by Italy under Benito Mussolini, which had long taken an interest in gaining dominance over Albania as an Italian sphere of influence during the interwar period. The Italians attempted to win the sympathies of the Muslim Albanian population by proposing to build a large mosque in Rome, though the Vatican opposed this measure and nothing came of it in the end. The Italian occupiers also won Muslim Albanian sympathies by causing their working wages to rise. Mussolini's son-in-law Count Ciano also replaced the leadership of the Sunni Muslim community, which had recognized the Italian regime in Albania, with clergy that aligned with Italian interests, with a compliant "Moslem Committee" organization, and Fischer notes that "the Moslem community at large accepted this change with little complaint". Most of the Bektashi order and its leadership were against the Italian occupation and remained an opposition group. Fischer suspects that the Italians eventually tired of the opposition of the Bektashi Order, and had its head, Nijaz Deda, murdered.

The Albanian Orthodox hierarchy also acquiesced in the occupation, according to Fischer. The primate of the church, Archbishop Kisi, along with three other bishops, expressed formal approval of the Italian invasion in 1939.

The Catholic Church and many Catholics were supportive of the invasion, but Fischer states there were many exceptions, particularly of among the village priests since most of them were trained in Albania and were quite nationalistic. Some of them even left Albania after the Italian invasion. But the hierarchy on the other hand was quite supportive, with the apostolic delegate seeing it as a possibility to give more freedom to Albanians who wanted to become Catholic. The Catholic Church had also the most financial support per member during the Italian occupation.

Religious state financing during the Zog and Italian eras (in French francs )
	Last Zog budget	First Italian budget	Evolution from the Zog to the Italian era
Sunni Muslims	50,000 francs	375,000 francs	+ 750%
Albanian Orthodox Church	35,000 francs	187,500 francs	+ 535%
Catholic Church in Albania	-	156,000 francs	-
Bektashi Order in Albania	-	-	-

=== Communism ===
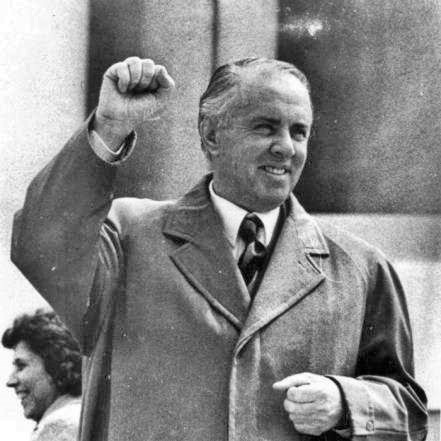
Enver Hoxha declared Albania an atheist state and attempted to remove all organized religion from the country

Before the Communists took power in 1944, it was estimated that of Albania's population of roughly 1,180,500 persons, about 70% belonged to Islamic sects while 30% belonged to Christian sects. Among the Muslims, at least 200,000 (or 17%) were Bektashis, while most of the rest were Sunnis, in addition to a collection of much smaller orders. Among the Christians, 212,500 (18%) were Orthodox while 142,000 (12%) were Catholic.

The Agrarian Reform Law of August 1946 nationalized most property of religious institutions, including the estates of monasteries, orders, and dioceses. Many clergy and believers were tried, tortured, and executed. All foreign Catholic priests, monks, and nuns were expelled in 1946.

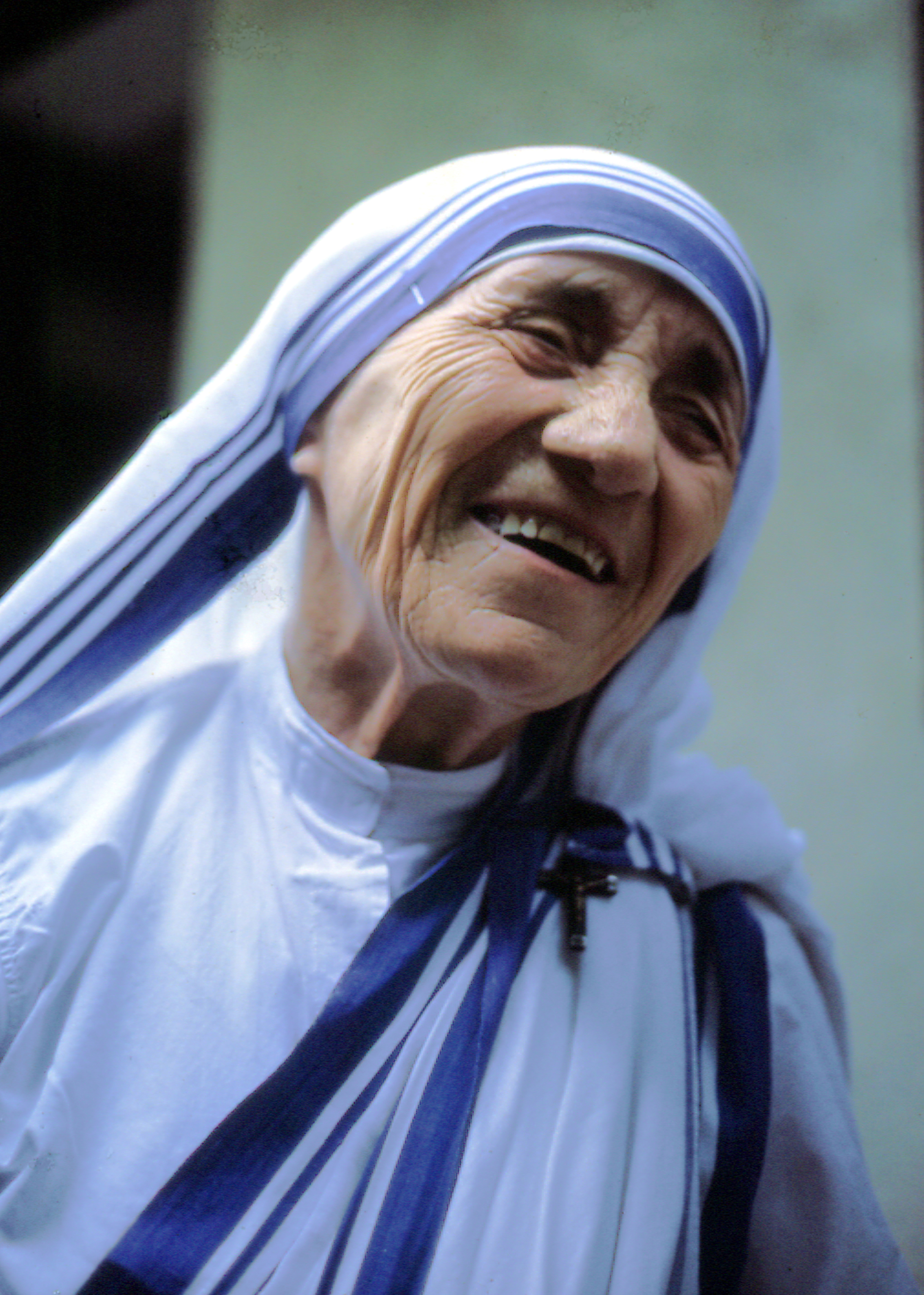
Mother Teresa was a Macedonian–born ethnic Albanian who later became a world-renowned missionary.

Religious communities or branches that had their headquarters outside the country, such as the Jesuit and Franciscan orders, were henceforth ordered to terminate their activities in Albania. Religious institutions were forbidden to have anything to do with the education of the young, because that had been made the exclusive province of the state. All religious communities were prohibited from owning real estate and from operating philanthropic and welfare institutions and hospitals. Although there were tactical variations in First Secretary of the Communist Party Enver Hoxha's approach to each of the major denominations, his overarching objective was the eventual destruction of all organized religion in Albania. Between 1945 and 1953, the number of priests was reduced drastically and the number of Catholic churches was decreased from 253 to 100, and all Catholics were stigmatized as fascists.

The campaign against religion peaked in the 1960s. Beginning in 1967 the Albanian authorities began a violent campaign to try to eliminate religious life in Albania. Despite complaints, even by Party of Labour of Albania members, all churches, mosques, tekkes, monasteries, and other religious institutions were either closed down or converted into warehouses, gymnasiums, or workshops by the end of 1967. By May 1967, religious institutions had been forced to relinquish all 2,169 churches, mosques, cloisters, and shrines in Albania, many of which were converted into cultural centres for young people. As the literary monthly Nendori reported the event, the youth had thus "created the first atheist nation in the world."

The clergy were publicly vilified and humiliated, their vestments taken and desecrated. More than 200 clerics of various faiths were imprisoned, others were forced to seek work in either industry or agriculture, and some were executed or starved to death. The monastery of the Franciscan order in Shkodër was set on fire, which resulted in the death of four elderly monks.

A major center for anti-religious propaganda was the National Museum of Atheism (Albanian: Muzeu Ateist) in Shkodër, the city viewed by the government as the most religiously conservative.

Article 37 of the Albanian Constitution of 1976 stipulated, "The State recognises no religion, and supports atheistic propaganda in order to implant a scientific materialistic world outlook in the people", and the penal code of 1977 imposed prison sentences of three to ten years for "religious propaganda and the production, distribution, or storage of religious literature." A new decree that in effect targeted Albanians with Islamic and religiously-tinged Christian names stipulated that citizens whose names did not conform to "the political, ideological, or moral standards of the state" were to change them. It was also decreed that towns and villages with religious names must be renamed. Hoxha's brutal antireligious campaign succeeded in eradicating formal worship, but some Albanians continued to practise their faith clandestinely, risking severe punishment. Individuals caught with Bibles, icons, or other religious objects faced long prison sentences. Religious weddings were prohibited. Parents were afraid to pass on their faith, for fear that their children would tell others. Officials tried to entrap practising Christians and Muslims during religious fasts, such as Lent and Ramadan, by distributing food at schools and workplaces during those fasting hours, and then publicly denouncing those who refused to eat during such times, and clergy who conducted secret services were incarcerated.

The article was interpreted as violating The United Nations Charter (chapter 9, article 55) which declares that religious freedom is an inalienable human right. The first time that the question of religious oppression in Albania came before the United Nations' Commission on Human Rights at Geneva was as late as 7 March 1983. A delegation from Denmark got its protest over Albania's violation of religious liberty placed on the agenda of the thirty-ninth meeting of the commission, item 25, reading, "Implementation of the Declaration on the Elimination of all Forms of Intolerance and of Discrimination based on Religion or Belief." There was little consequence at first, but on 20 July 1984 a member of the Danish Parliament inserted an article in one of Denmark's major newspapers protesting the violation of religious freedom in Albania.

After the death of Enver Hoxha in 1985, his successor, Ramiz Alia, adopted a relatively tolerant stance toward religious practice, referring to it as "a personal and family matter." Émigré clergymen were permitted to reenter the country in 1988 and officiate at religious services. Mother Teresa, an ethnic Albanian, visited the country in 1989, where she was received in Tirana by the foreign minister and by Hoxha's widow and where she laid a wreath on Hoxha's grave. In December 1990, the ban on religious observance was officially lifted, in time to allow thousands of Christians to attend Christmas services.

The atheistic campaign had significant results especially to the Greek minority, since religion which was now criminalized was traditionally an integral part of its cultural life and identity.

== Religions ==
According to the 2023 census, Muslims form the plurality in every county of Albania except the Lezhë County in the north. Atheists, believers without denomination and those who refused to answer are mainly concentrated in the southern part of the country. Catholics are mainly concentrated in the two northern counties of Lezhë and Shkodër while Orthodox are also concentrated in the southern counties. Bektashis live mostly in the central and southern parts of Albania.

=== Islam ===
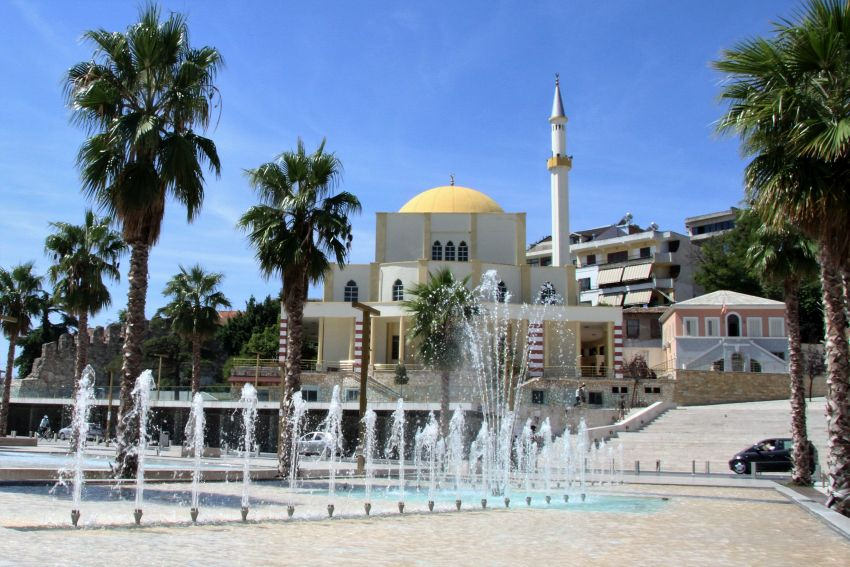
Great Mosque of Durrës

Islam was first introduced to Albania in the 15th century after the Ottoman conquest of the area. It is the largest religion in the country, nominally representing 50.67% of the total population (Sunni Muslims, Bektashians and Non-denominational Muslims) according to the 2023 Census in Albania. One of the major legacies of nearly five centuries of Ottoman rule was that the majority of Albanians had converted to Islam. Therefore, the nation emerged as a Muslim-majority country after Albania's independence in November 1912.

In the north, the spread of Islam was slower due to the resistance of the Catholic Church and the region's mountainous terrain. In the center and south, however, Catholicism was not as strong and by the end of the 17th century the region had largely adopted the religion of the growing Albanian Muslim elite. The existence of an Albanian Muslim class of pashas and beys who played an increasingly important role in Ottoman political and economic life became an attractive career option for most Albanians. Widespread illiteracy and the absence of educated clergy also played roles in the spread of Islam, especially in northern Albanian-inhabited regions. During the 17th and 18th centuries Albanians converted to Islam in large numbers, often under sociopolitical duress experienced as repercussions for rebelling and for supporting the Catholic powers of Venice and Austria and Orthodox Russia in their wars against the Ottomans.

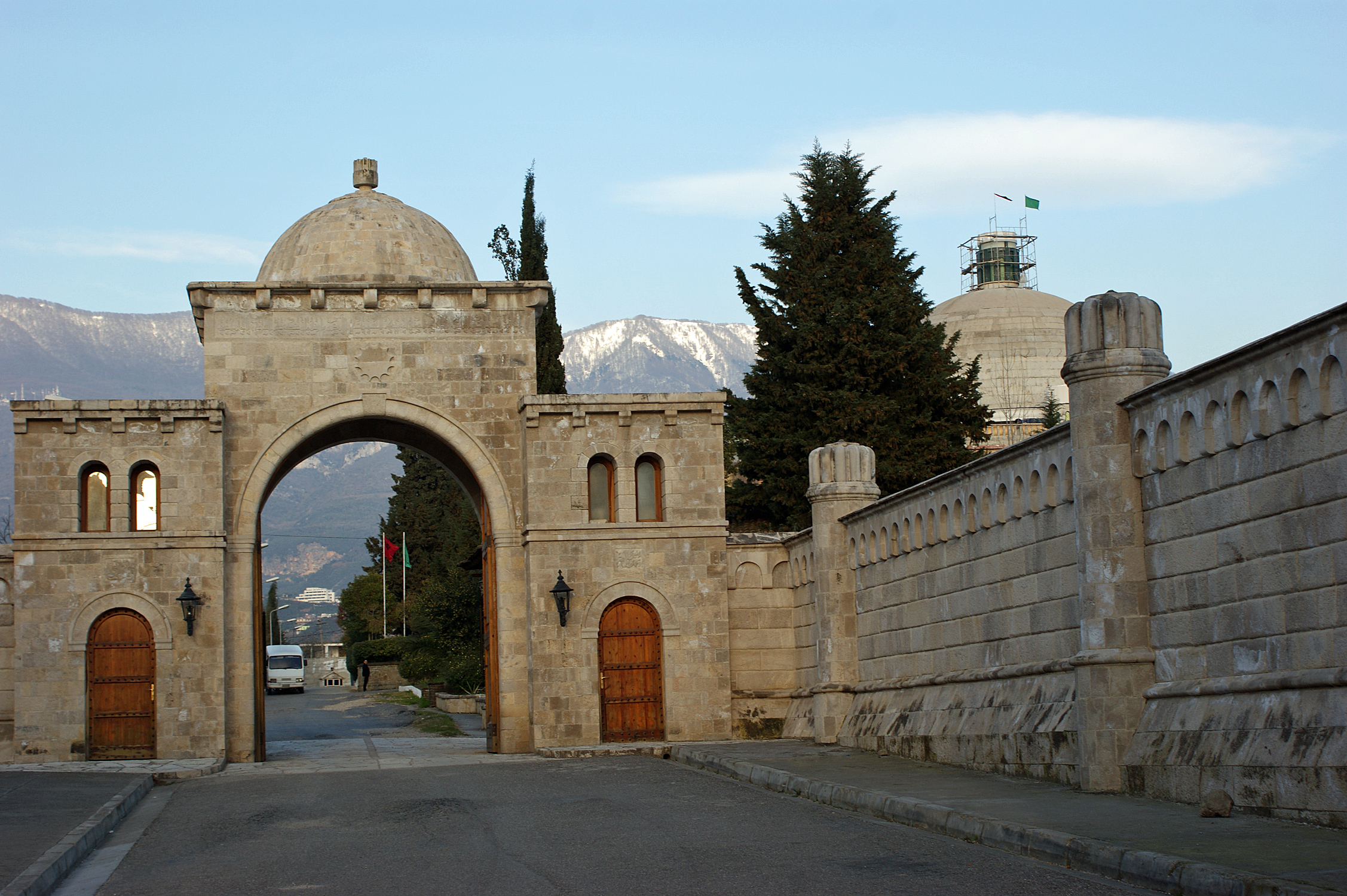
World Headquarters of the Bektashi in Tirana

In the 20th century, the power of Muslim, Catholic and Orthodox clergy was weakened during the years of monarchy and it was eradicated during the 1940s and 1950s, under the state policy of obliterating all organized religion from Albanian territories.

During the Ottoman invasion the Muslims of Albania were divided into two main communities: those associated with Sunni Islam and those associated with Bektashi Shiism, a mystical Dervish order that came to Albania through the Albanian Janissaries that served in the Ottoman army and whose members practised Albanian pagan rites under a nominal Islamic cover. After the Bektashians were banned in Turkey in 1925 by Atatürk, the order moved its headquarters to Tirana and the Albanian government subsequently recognized it as a body independent from Sunnism. Sunni Muslims were estimated to represent approximately 50% of the country's population before 1939, while Bektashi represented another 20%. Muslim populations have been particularly strong in eastern and northern Albania and among Albanians living in Kosovo and Macedonia.

==== Sunni Islam ====
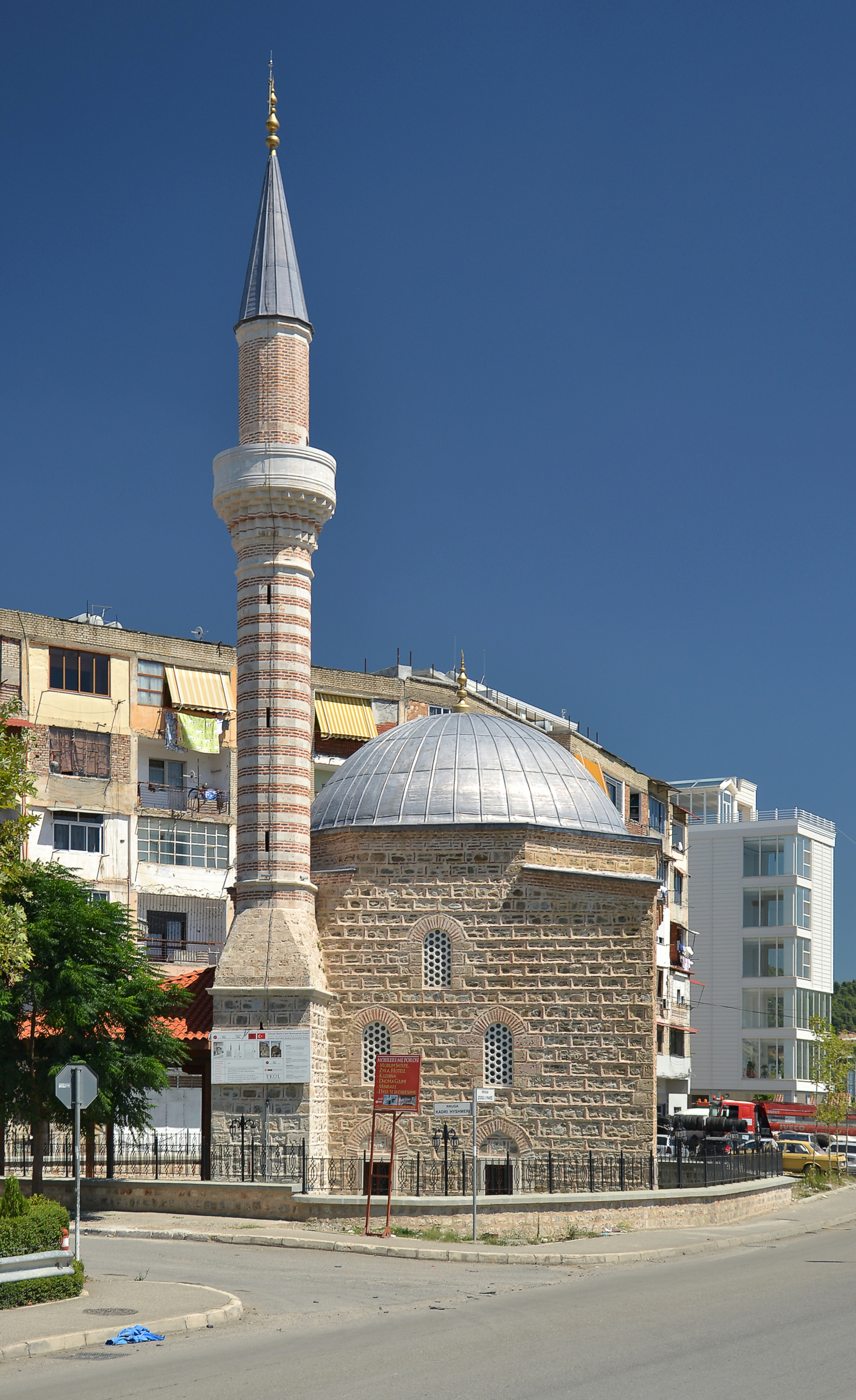
Mosque in Elbasan

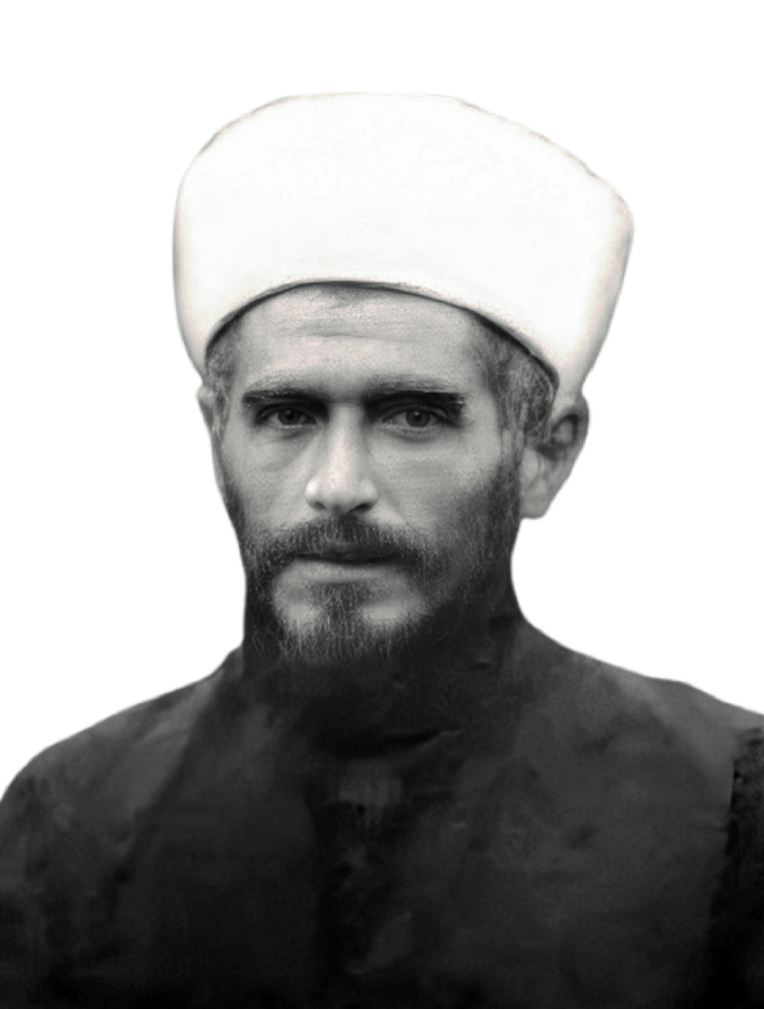
Vehbi Dibra (Agolli) served as the first grand mufti of the Muslim Community of Albania.

Sunni Muslims have historically lived in the cities of Albania, while Bektashians mainly live in remote areas, whereas Catholics mainly live in the north, and Orthodox Christians mainly live in the south of the country. However, this division does not apply nowadays. In a study by Pew Research, 65% of Albanian Muslims did not specify a branch of Islam that they belonged to. The Albanian census does not differentiate between Bektashians and Sunnis, but instead between Bektashians and "Muslims", but since Bektashians are in fact Muslim many were listed as Muslims. Bektashi-majority areas include Skrapari, Dishnica, Erseka and Bulqiza while Bektashians also have large, possibly majority concentrations in Kruja, Mallakastra, Tepelena, large pockets of the Gjirokastër and Delvina Districts (i.e. Gjirokastër itself, Lazarat, etc.), and Western and Northeastern parts of the Vlora district. There are also historically substantial Bektashi minorities around Elbasan, Berat, Leskovik, Përmet, Saranda and Pogradec. In Kosovo and Macedonia there were pockets of Bektashians in Gjakova, Prizren and Tetova. In the Albanian census, a few of these areas, such as Skrapari and Dishnica, saw the Bektashi population mostly labeled "Bektashi" while in most other areas such as Kruja it was mostly labeled "Muslim". The classification of children of mixed marriages between Sunnis and Bektashians or the widespread phenomenon of both groups marrying Orthodox Albanians also have inconsistent classification and oftentimes the offspring of such unions associate with both of their parents' faiths and occasionally practice both.

In December 1992 Albania became a full member of the Organisation of the Islamic Conference (now the Organisation of Islamic Cooperation).

==== Bektashism ====
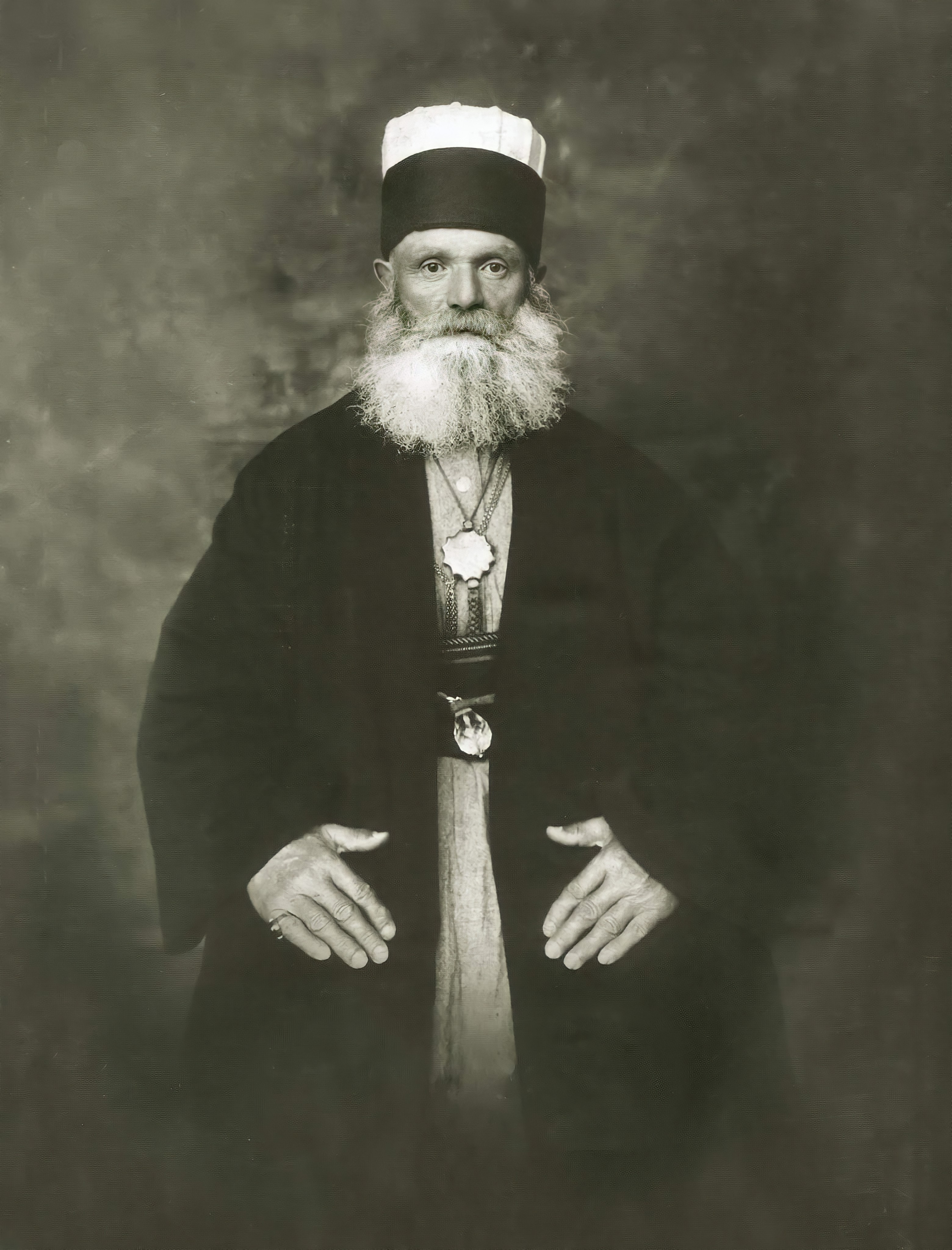
Dedebaba Sali Nijazi Dede established the Bektashi Order in Albania and subsequently moved its headquarters there.

The Bektashi Order was widespread in the Ottoman Empire, with most leading Bektashi babas from southern Albania. The Bektashi order was banned throughout the Ottoman Empire by Sultan Mahmud II in 1826. After Mustafa Kemal Atatürk banned all Sufi orders in 1925, the Bektashi leadership moved to Albania and established their headquarters in the city of Tirana, where the community declared its separation from the Sunni. Under communist rule from 1945 - 1990, Bektashism was banned in Albania.

Many "tekkes" (lodges) operate today in Albania. Approximately 20% of Muslims identify themselves as having some connection to Bektashism.

==== Other Sufi congregations ====
The Halveti order first started to spread in Southern Albania in the 16th century and gained many followers later. They are considered to be less numerous than the Bektashians (and occasionally confused with them) but still significant. During periods of suppression of the Bektashiansby the Ottoman authorities, Bektashi tekkes were often conferred upon the Halvetis, such as happened in Kanina, near Vlora. There are large concentrations of Halvetis in Devoll, Tropoja, Luma (around Kukes) and in mountainous valleys in the Kurvelesh region. Halvetis also live near Bektashiansin Mallakastra, Tepelena, Gjirokastër, Delvina, Permet, Leskovik, Korçë, and the city of Berat. The first Albanian Halveti tekke however was in Ioannina, now Greece. After the fall of communism, in 1998, it was reported that there were 42 Bektashi tekkes in Albania.

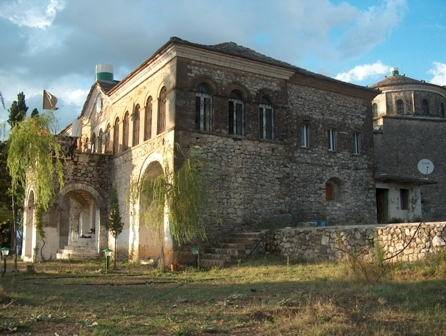
Melani Tekke

In the late 19th century there was a flourishing Rufai community around Gjakova, in Kosovo, which helped spread the sect in various parts of Albania. During the early years of the 20th century some Rufai tekkes became Bektashi. At the same time, in the same period the order spread to Tropoja, Tirana, Petrela and parts of Southern Albania. In Albania all of their tekkes were closed due to the banning of religion under Communism, but in Yugoslavia the order continued to operate major tekkes in Gjakova, Mitrovica, Skopje, Peja, Rahovec and Prizren. After the fall of Communism, the order reconstituted itself in Albania and opened a tekke in Tirana in 1998.

The Sa'dis originated in Damascus and in Albania have a close relationship with the Bektashians. Both were favored by Ali Pasha and they looked after and venerated each other's holy places and tombs. There was a Sa'di tekke in Gjakova in 1600, and two Sa'di tekkes in Tepelena two centuries later, as well as some historical presence in Tropoja, Gjirokastër, Elbasan and Peza. In 1980 in Kosovo, there are 10 operating Sa'di tekkes.

The Kadris first originated as a distinct sect in Istanbul in the 17th century, then were spread to the Balkans as the "Zindjiris" by Ali Baba of Crete, originally spreading from within the Bektashi community. There are Kadri tekkes in Tirana, Berat and Peqin, but the main center of the Kadris is Peshkopia in Diber County. In 1945 they were finally recognized as a distinct religious community; since the fall of Communism, they have reconstituted themselves and now have an operating tekke in Peshkopia.

=== Christianity ===
==== Catholicism ====
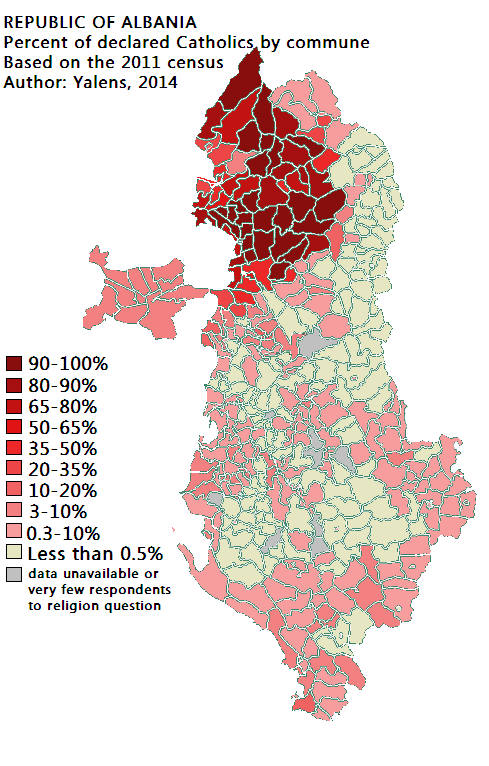
Distribution of Catholic believers in Albania as according to the 2011 Census.

In the 2023 census, about 8.38% of Albania's population were declared as Catholic Christianity. Albania once numbered eighteen episcopal Sees, some of them having uninterrupted activity from the dawn of the Catholicism until today. The country has been a Catholic bridgehead in the Balkans, with Catholic Albanians playing a role not unlike the Croats in the former Yugoslavia. In the Middle Ages, Albania was ruled by many Catholic rulers, including natives but notably the Angevins and it became a site of the spread of Catholicism in the Balkans at the expense of Orthodoxy as previously Orthodox Albanian nobles and their subjects converted as they grew increasingly loyal to the Western powers as a way to fend off threats coming from Orthodox political entities. Despite the ascendance of Catholicism at the time, Orthodox minorities remained. Before long, Durrës and Kruja became major centers of Balkan Catholicism, and in 1167 it was a significant event when Kruja became a Catholic bishopric, with the new bishop consecrated by the Pope himself. Vlora and Butrint also saw Catholicization, and at the peak of Catholic power in the Balkans with Albania as a stronghold, Catholic structures began appearing as far afield as Skopje in 1326. At the end of the 14th century, the previously Orthodox Autocephalous Archbishopric of Ohrid was dismantled in favor of the Catholic rite.

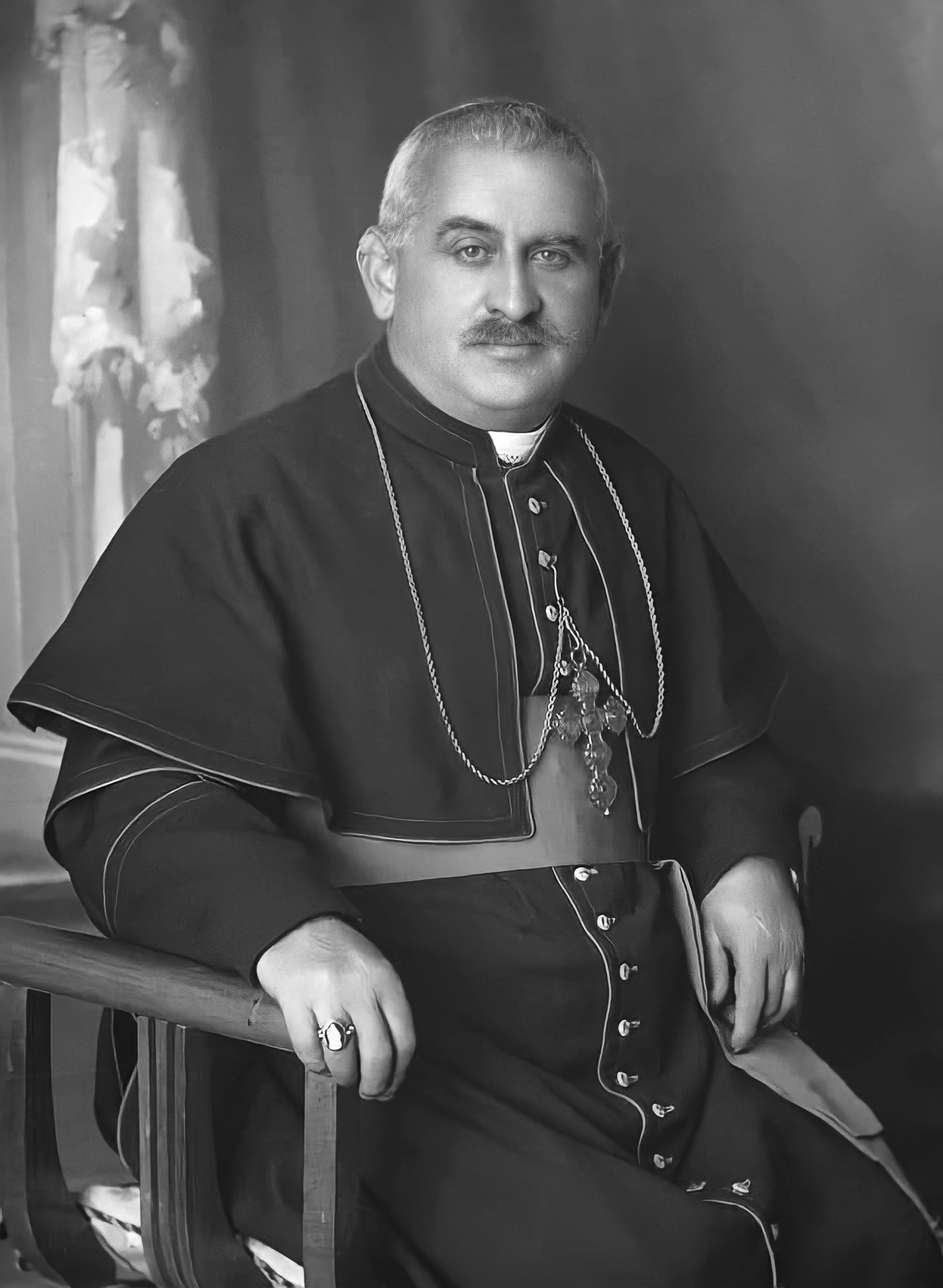
Archbishop of Durrës Vinçenc Prennushi was an important figure of the post Independence period who was noted for his poetry.

However, Ottoman rule ultimately vastly decreased the number of Catholics in Albania and elsewhere in the Balkans, with waves of conversions to Islam and to a lesser extent Orthodoxy occurring especially in the 17th century after a series of failed rebellions and punitive measures which involved drastic raises in the taxes of the Catholic population. The tribal population of Mirdita saw very few conversions because the ease they had defending their terrain meant the Ottomans interfered less in their affairs, and the Republic of Venice prevented Islamisation in Venetian Albania. Today, Catholic Albanians are mostly found in the areas of Malesia e Madhe, Kiri, Puka, Tropoja (where they are a minority), Mirdita, parts of northwestern Mat, Kurbin, Lezhe, Zadrima, Shkodër and Ulqin (where they live alongside very large numbers of Sunni Muslims), minorities in Kruja and some major cities, as well as scattered pockets throughout Gheg-inhabited areas. While there remained a small Albanian Catholic community in Vlore during Ottoman times, larger numbers of Catholics were reported in the South after the fall of Communism, often in traditionally Orthodox areas.

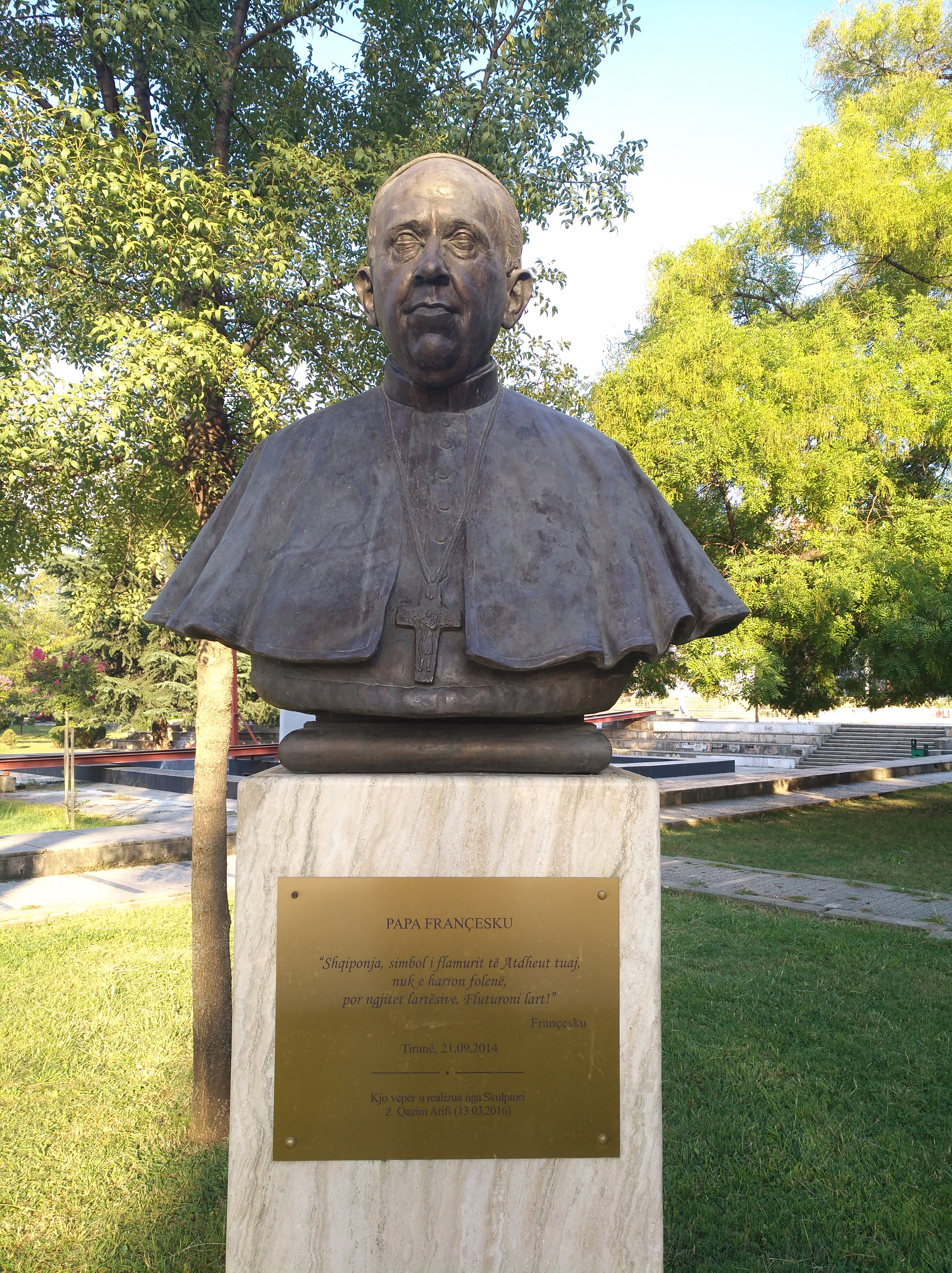
Pope Francis bust in Tirana erected in honor of his 2014 visit to Albania

For four centuries, the Catholic Albanians defended their faith, aided by Franciscan missionaries, beginning in the middle of the 17th century, when persecution by Ottoman Turkish lords in Albania started to result in the conversion of many villages to the Islamic faith.

The College of Propaganda at Rome played a significant role in the religious and moral support of the Albanian Catholics. During the 17th and 18th centuries, the College contributed in educating young clerics appointed to service on Albanian missions, as well as to the financial support of the churches. Work was done by the Austrian Government at the time, which offered significant financial aid in its role as Protector of the Christian community under Ottoman rule.

Church legislation of the Albanians was reformed by Clement XI, who convoked a general ecclesiastical visitation, held in 1763 by the Archbishop of Antivari, by the end of which a national synod was held. The decrees formulated by the Synod were printed by the College of Propaganda in 1705, and renewed in 1803. In 1872, Pius IX convoked a second national synod at Shkodër, for the revival of the popular and ecclesiastical life. Owing to Austrian interest in Albania, the institution of the Catholic bishops of Albania was obtained through a civil decree released by the Vilajet of Berat.

Albania was divided ecclesiastically into several archiepiscopal provinces:

- Tivari Since 1878 part of the principality of Montenegro. Since 1886, it has been separate from Scutari, with which it had been united in 1867 on equal terms.
- Scutari, with the suffragan Sees of Alessio, Pulati, Sappa and (since 1888) the Abbatia millius of St. Alexander of Orosci.
- Durazzo
- Uskup

The last two archiepiscopal provinces did not have any suffragans, and depended directly on the Holy See. A seminary, founded in 1858 by Archbishop Topich of Scutari, was destroyed by the Ottomans, but was later re-established on Austrian territory and placed under imperial protection.

Catholic Church in Albania

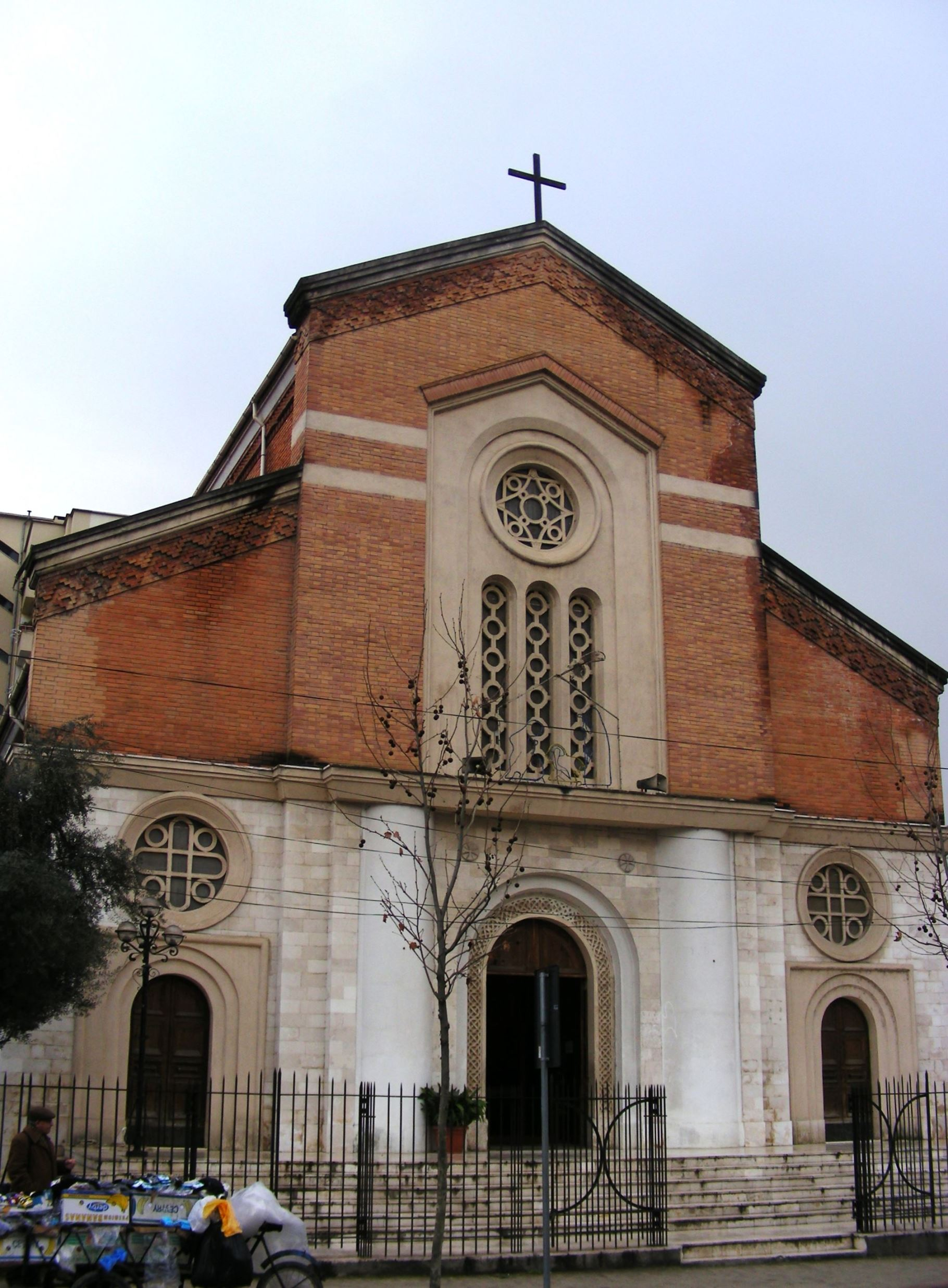
Sacred Heart Church in Tirana

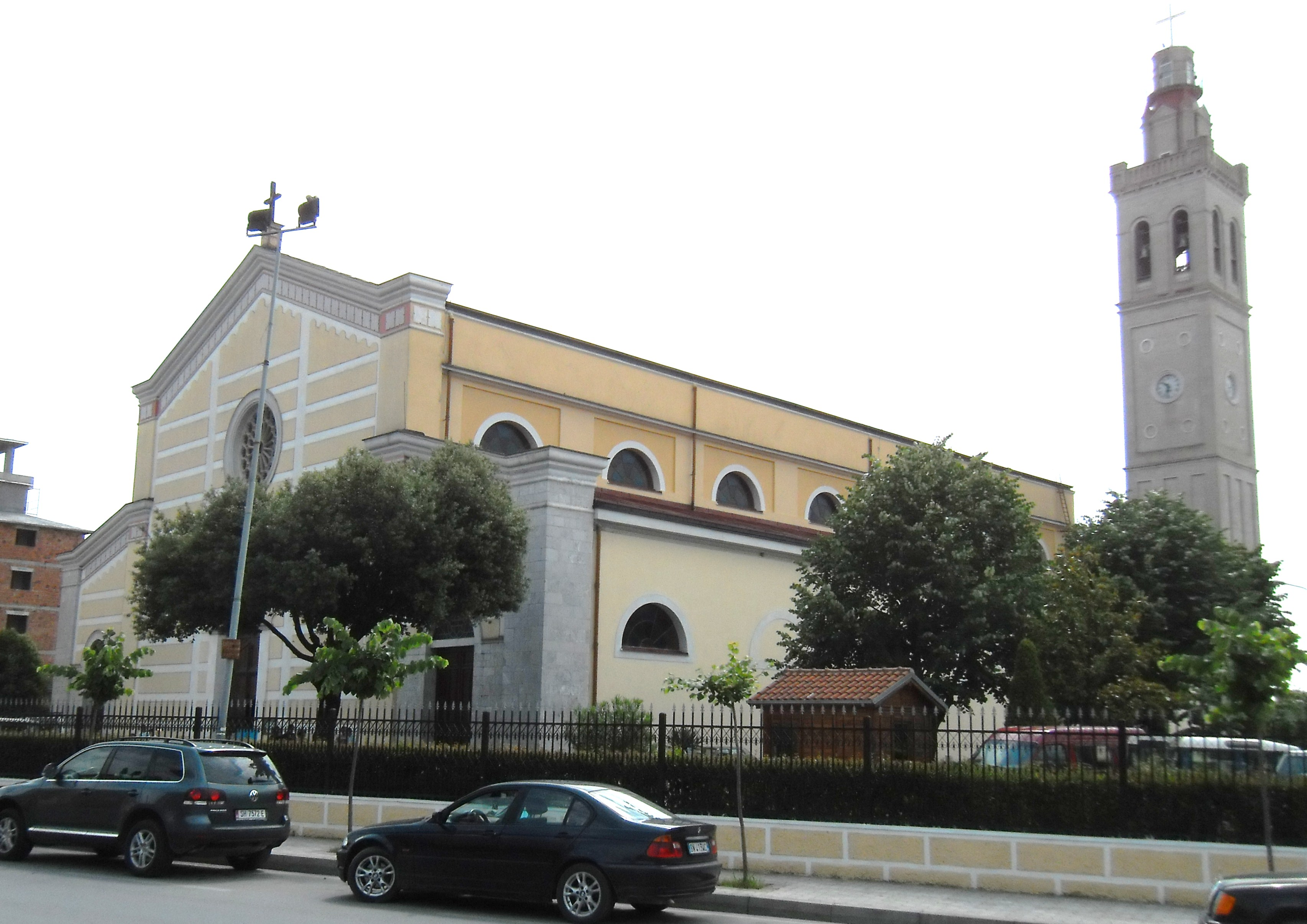
Shkodër Cathedral

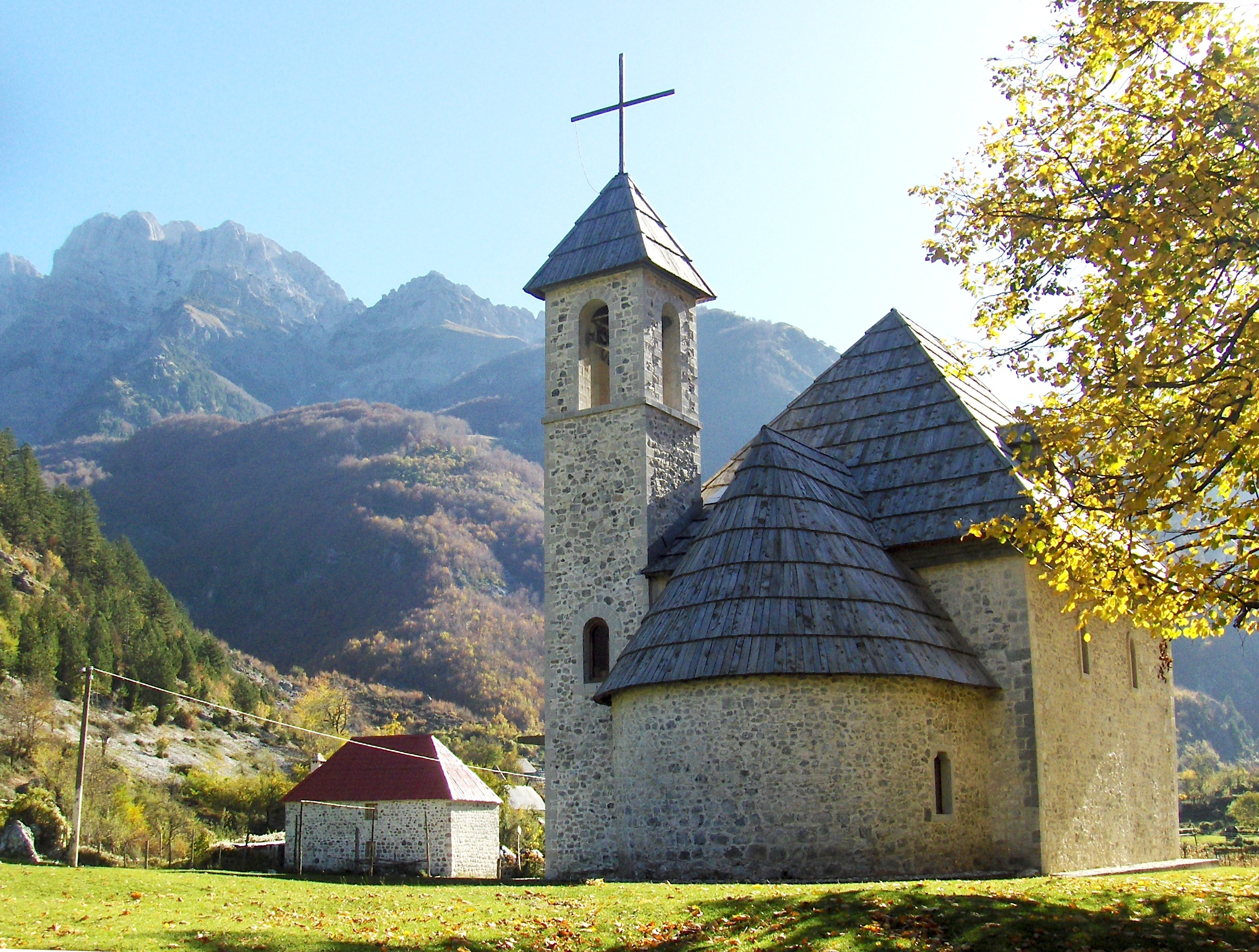
Church in Theth

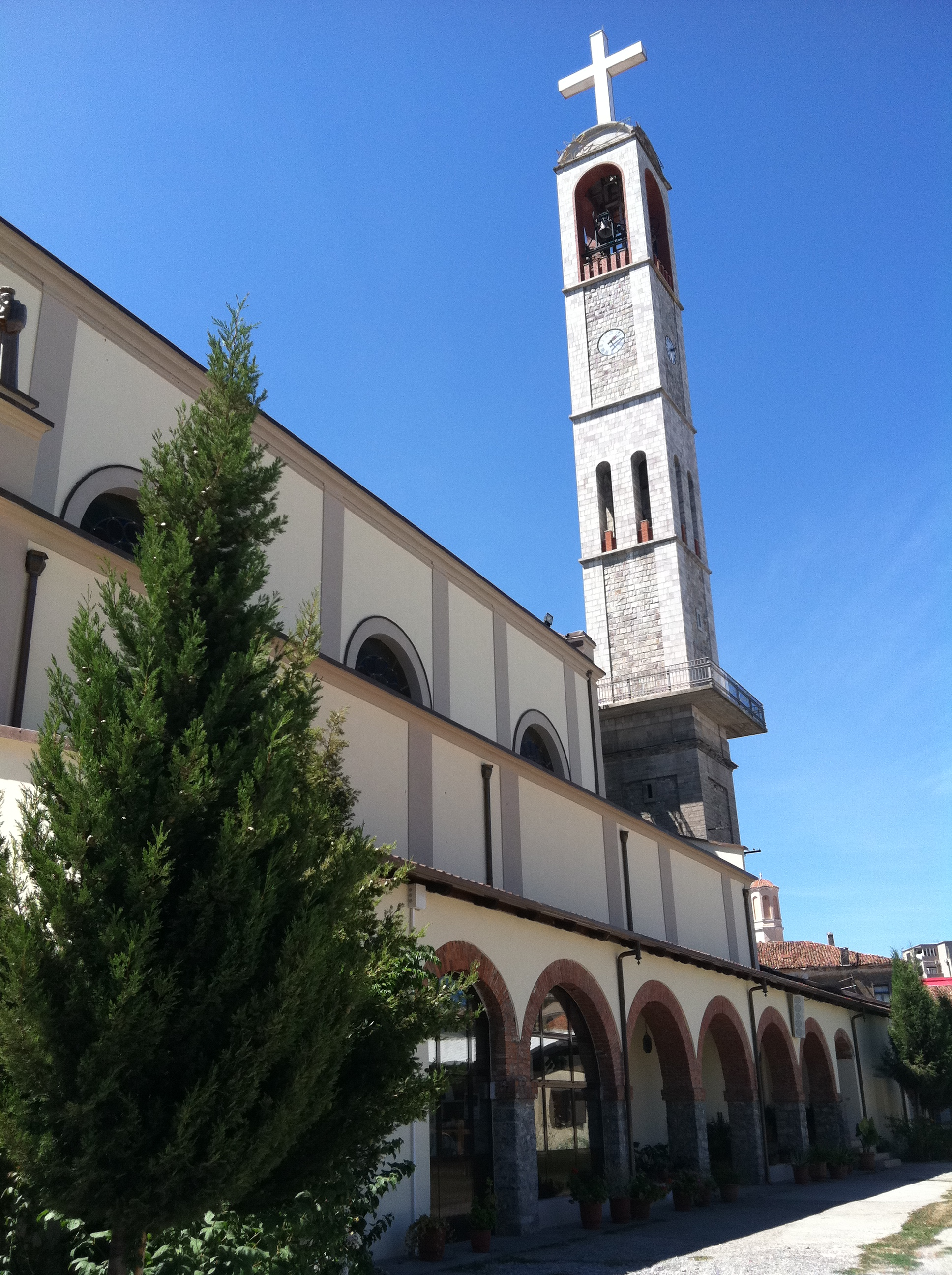
Franciscan Church of Shkodër

===== Greek Catholicism =====
The Albanian Greek Catholic Church exists in southern Albania and is under an Apostolic Administration. It has less than 4,000 members.

==== Eastern Orthodoxy ====
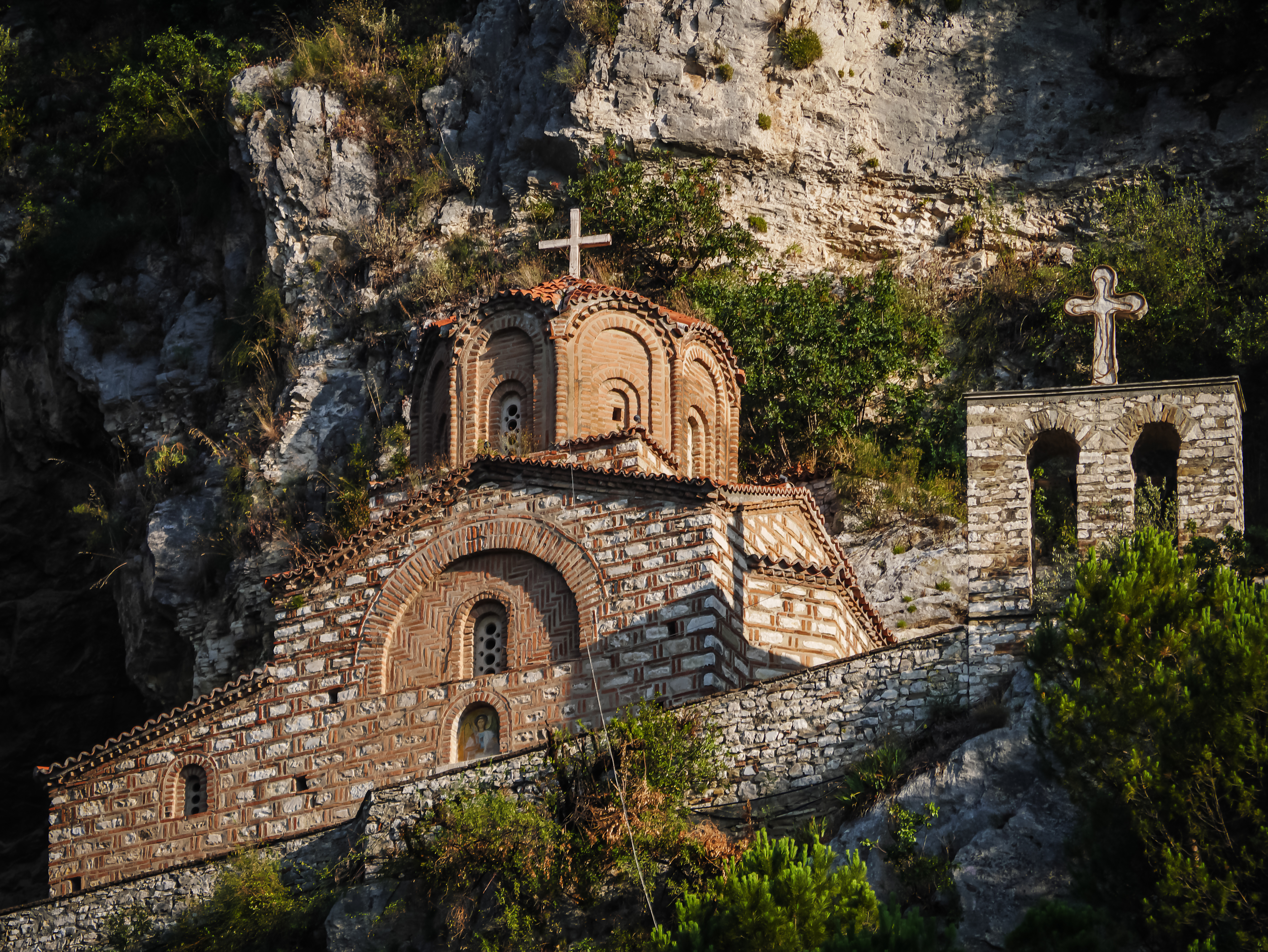
St. Michael's Church of Berat

According to the 2023 Census, 7.22% of the Albanian population were declared themselves as Albanian Orthodox. Three ethnic groups, Albanians, Greeks, and Aromanians, account for the vast majority of Albania's Orthodox believers. Metropolitan Theofan Fan Noli established the Albanian Orthodox Mission under the American diocese.

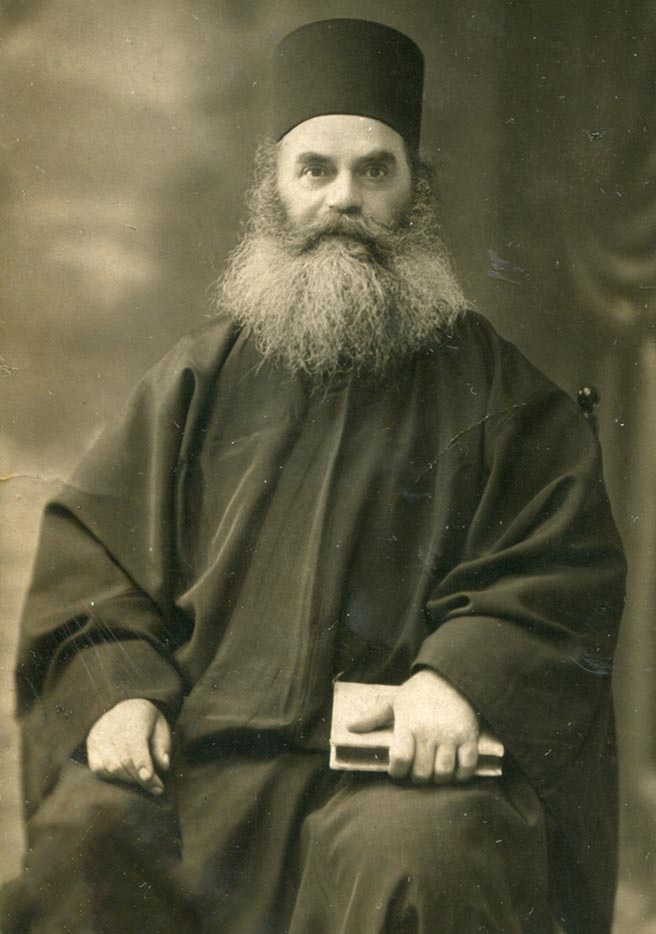
The first archbishop of the Orthodox Church of Albania was Visarion Xhuvani, a member of the prominent Xhuvani family of Elbasan.

Although Orthodox Christianity has existed in Albania since the 2nd century AD, and the Orthodox historically constituted 20% of the population of Albania, the first Orthodox liturgy in the Albanian language was celebrated not in Albania, but in Massachusetts. Subsequently, when the Orthodox Church was allowed no official existence in communist Albania, Albanian Orthodoxy survived in exile in Boston (1960–89). It is a curious history that closely entwines Albanian Orthodoxy with the Bay State.

Between 1890 and 1920, approximately 25,000 Albanians, the majority of them Orthodox Christians from southeastern Albania, emigrated to the United States, settling in and around Boston. Like many other Orthodox immigrants, they were predominantly young and males. Like so many other Balkan immigrants, a large number (almost 10,000) returned to their homeland after World War I.

Since the 2nd century AD, the liturgical services, schools and activities of the Orthodox Church in Albania had been conducted in Greek. When Albania came under Ottoman influence in the 15th century the Orthodox people of Albania were members of the Archbishopric of Ohrid which was officially recognized by the Ottoman Empire.

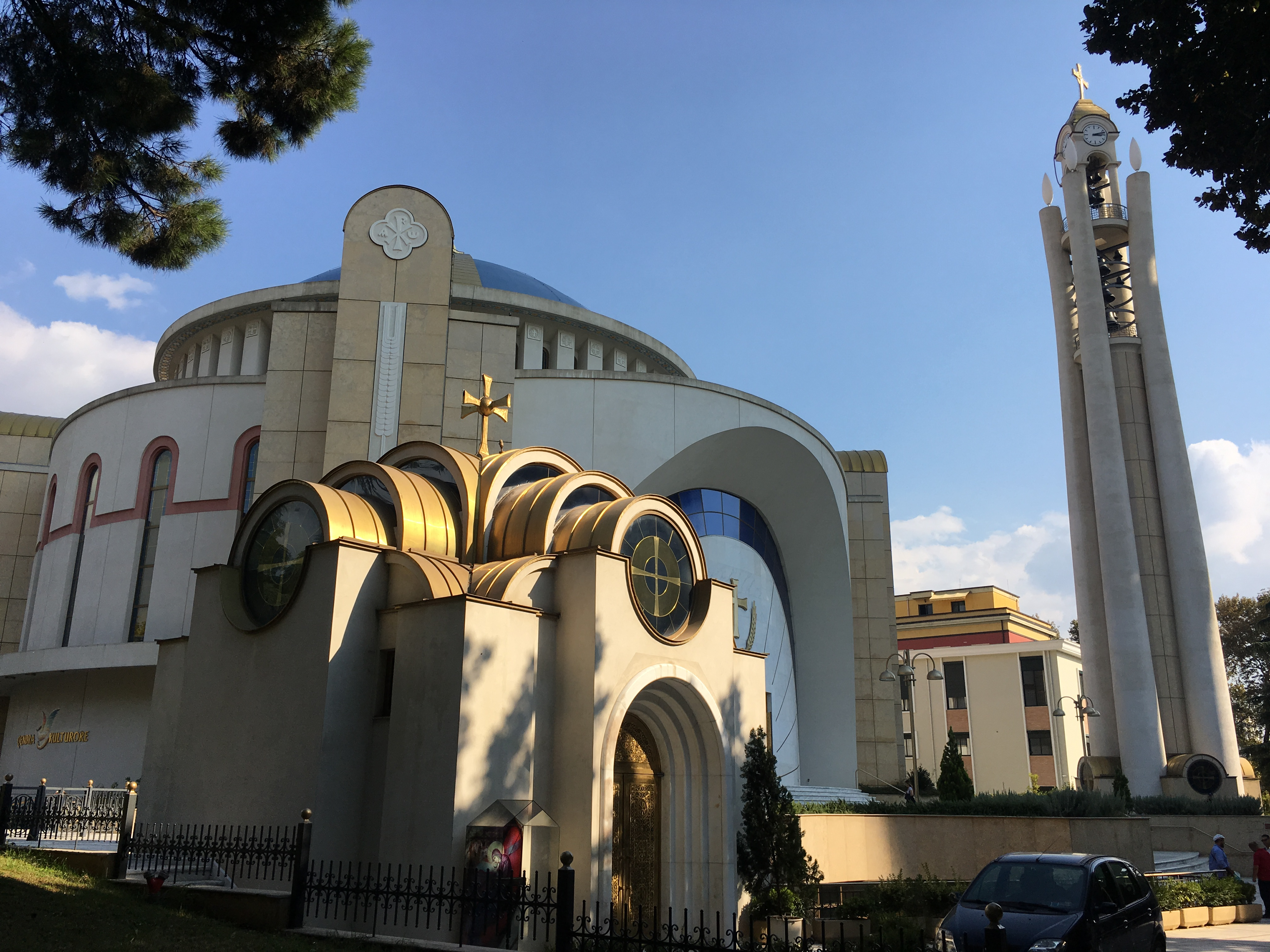
Resurrection Cathedral in Tirana

Those Albanian Orthodox, who, in the fashion of 19th century Balkan nationalism, sought to see their church as an Albanian rather than Greek body, were frequently excommunicated by the Greek-speaking hierarchy. Considering that identity during the Ottoman centuries was defined primarily by religious affiliations, such questions in the post-Ottoman period loomed large in the burgeoning national and cultural identities. After the Ecumenical Patriarchate in Constantinople lost in 1870 jurisdictional control over the Bulgarians in the Ottoman Empire, the Patriarchate did not desire further schisms within its ranks. Indeed, so strong was the rivalry of Greeks with Orthodox Albanians who opted for separate cultural activities, that some of the latter category such as Papa Kristo Negovani, a priest educated in Greek schools, Sotir Ollani, Petro Nini Luarasi, Nuci Naco and others were murdered for their patriotic efforts.

Nationalist fervor ran high in Albanian immigrant communities in North America. When, in 1906, a Greek priest from an independent Greek parish in Hudson, Massachusetts, refused to bury an Albanian nationalist, an outraged Albanian community petitioned the missionary diocese to assist them in establishing a separate Albanian-language parish within the missionary diocese. Fan Noli, an ardent Albanian nationalist and former parish cantor, was subsequently ordained in February 1908 by a sympathetic Metropolitan Platon to serve this new Albanian parish. Noli went on to organize five additional Albanian parishes, mainly in Massachusetts, as an Albanian Orthodox Mission in America under the auspices of the American diocese. Noli later emigrated to Albania, served as the Albanian delegate to the League of Nations, was consecrated Bishop and Primate of the independent Orthodox Church in Albania in 1923, and even served briefly as Prime Minister of Albania (came in power with the so-called The Revolution of 1924) but was overthrown in a coup by Ahmet Zogu on the same year. After years in exile in Germany, Noli returned to the United States in 1932, studied at Harvard, translated Shakespeare into Albanian and Orthodox Scriptures and services into English, and led the Albanian Orthodox community in the United States until his death in 1965.

==== Protestantism ====
In the early 19th century, in accordance with the Protestant practice of making the Scriptures available to all people in their common tongue, the British and Foreign Bible Society began to make plans for the translation, printing, and distribution of the New Testament in Albanian. Soon Alexander Thomson, a Scottish missionary, joined the Society and visited Albania in 1863. Kostandin Kristoforidhi also joined the Society to translate the Scriptures in both Geg and Tosk dialects. In the late 19th century the Society's workers traveled throughout Albania distributing Bibles, under the leadership of Gjerasim Qiriazi who converted, preached the Gospel in Korçë, and became the head of the first "Evangelical Brotherhood". Qiriazi sought official government recognition for the Albanian Evangelical Church in 1887, a pursuit which would not be fulfilled until 10 March 2011 by Law No. 10394.

=== Judaism ===
The history of the Jews in Albania dates back at least 2,000 years dating back to 70 CE. Albanian Jews, predominantly Sephardi, have only constituted a very small percentage of the population in modern times.

In 1673 the charismatic Jewish prophet Sabbatai Zevi was exiled by the Turkish sultan to the Albanian port of Ulqin, now in Montenegro, dying there some years later.

Over the course of World War II Albania saw its Jewish population increase. During the communist dictatorship of Enver Hoxha, the Socialist People's Republic of Albania banned all religions, including Judaism, in adherence to the doctrine of state atheism. In the post-Communist era, these policies were abandoned and freedom of religion was extended, although the number of practising Jews in Albania today remains small, with many Jews having made aliyah to Israel. Today Jews number around 150. In December 2010 Israeli Chief Rabbi Shlomo Amar installed Rabbi Yoel Kaplan as the country's first Chief Rabbi. Recognition of Judaism as an official religion and Rabbi Kaplan as Chief Rabbi were the result of Prime Minister Sali Berisha's efforts.

=== Baháʼí Faith ===
The Baháʼí Faith in Albania was introduced in the 1930s by Refo Çapari, an Albanian politician. Over the recent years several Baháʼí education centres have also been founded.

=== Irreligion ===
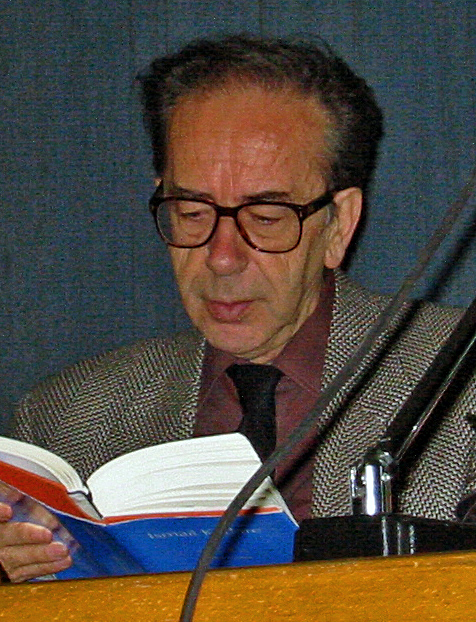
Novelist Ismail Kadare has declared himself an atheist

Irreligion is and has been historically present among Albanians. In the 2023 Census, considerable share, 13.8 percent, stated that they are believers but do not belong to any particular religion or faith, while 3.6 % declared that they are ‘Atheists’, and 10.2% declared ‘Prefer not to answer’ to the question on religion. Nowadays, estimations of the size of the irreligious population vary widely. The self-declared atheist population has been given figures ranging from 3.6% to 8% to 9% while other estimates of irreligiosity have reported figures of 39% declaring as "atheists"(9%) or "nonreligious"(30%), 61% not saying religion was "important" to their lives, and 72% "non-practising".

Albanian national revivalists in the 19th century such as Faik Konica, Jani Vreto, and Zef Jubani were often anti-clerical in rhetoric (Konica said in 1897: "Every faith religion makes me puke", or Albanian: Më vjen për të vjellur nga çdo fe), but the first advocate of atheism in modern Albania is thought to have been Ismet Toto, a publicist and revolutionary whose 1934 anti-religious polemic, Grindje me klerin, was one of the first known works advocating against the practice of religion itself in the Albanian language.

Under Socialist rule in 1967, leader Enver Hoxha persecuted and outlawed public religious practice and adopted state atheism.

Some well-known Albanian contemporary atheists include Ismail Kadare, Dritëro Agolli, Ben Blushi, Fatos Lubonja, Mustafa Nano, Saimir Pirgu, Diana Çuli, Gilman Bakalli, Fatos Tarifa, Edmond Tupja, Ylli Rakipi, Elton Deda, and Moikom Zeqo.

== Religious demography ==
Religious Belief in Albania (KAS, December 2024)
1. I believe in God but not in any religion (33.8%)
2. Atheist/Agnostic (7.20%)
3. Bektashi (5.20%)
4. Other Shia tariqas (0.50%)
5. Muslim (Sunnis) (36.0%)
6. Catholic Christian (7.90%)
7. Orthodox Christian (8.00%)
8. Protestant/other Christian (1.30%)

According to the 2023 census, there were 1,101,718 (45.86%) Sunni Muslims (also non-denominational Muslims) 201,530 (8.38%) Catholics, 173,645 (7.22%) Eastern Orthodox, 115,644 (4.81%) Bektashi Muslims, 9,658 (0.4%) Evangelicals, 3 670 (0.15%) of other religions, 332,155 (13.82%) believers without a religion or denomination, 85,311 (3.55%) Atheists and 378,782 (15.76%) did not provide an answer.

A December 2024 survey by the Konrad Adenauer Foundation (KAS) found that 41.5% of Albanians believe in God without following a specific religion (33.8%) or identify as atheist or agnostic (7.2%). Sunni Muslims make up 36.0% of the population, while 17.2% are Christians (7.9% Catholic, 8.0% Orthodox, and 1.3% Protestant or other Christian denominations). Additionally, 5.7% adhere to Bektashism (5.2%) or other Shia tariqas (0.5%).

Muslims are found throughout Albania and form the largest single religious group according to the 2023 census, while Catholics are most numerous in the north and north-west and Orthodox Christians are more concentrated in the south and south-east. In addition the Bektashi Order is recognised as a separate religious group in official statistics and making up around five percent of the population, with historic strongholds in south-central regions such as Skrapar and the area around Mount Tomorr. This regional pattern is approximate rather than strict, since many towns and especially Tirana and other major urban centres have mixed populations and sizeable numbers of people who either declare themselves as believers without a religion or denomination, identify as atheists or do not state any affiliation. Members of the Greek minority, concentrated in the south, are predominantly Orthodox and mostly belong to the Orthodox Church of Albania. The four traditional religious communities are usually taken to be Sunni Muslims, Bektashis, Catholics and Orthodox Christians, alongside smaller communities of Protestant denominations and followers of the Baháʼí Faith, Jehovah's Witnesses, the Church of Jesus Christ of Latter-day Saints and other religious groups.

Religious affiliation in the counties of Albania (2023 Census)
County	Emblem	Muslims	Bektashi	Catholics	Orthodox	Other Christians	Unaffiliated believers	Atheists	No response / other
Berat County		29.39%	8.10%	0.61%	5.82%	0.21%	15.19%	5.08%	35.60%
Dibër County	Emblem of Dibër County	62.68%	5.89%	1.60%	0.10%	0.07%	8.95%	0.67%	20.04%
Durrës County		54.61%	5.32%	6.01%	2.96%	0.34%	13.32%	1.62%	15.82%
Elbasan County		52.94%	1.37%	0.70%	5.22%	0.29%	17.52%	4.37%	17.59%
Fier County		39.00%	5.88%	0.79%	15.95%	0.37%	18.08%	4.98%	14.96%
Gjirokastër County		14.40%	21.04%	1.19%	25.32%	0.26%	14.36%	7.29%	16.16%
Korçë County		49.03%	4.57%	0.63%	16.18%	0.89%	11.56%	3.52%	13.63%
Kukës County		84.92%	0.51%	2.87%	0.08%	0.15%	5.63%	0.41%	5.43%
Lezhë County		17.52%	0.58%	74.40%	0.39%	0.22%	1.87%	0.47%	4.55%
Shkodër County		47.08%	0.20%	43.55%	0.44%	0.21%	1.92%	0.35%	6.25%
Tiranë County		48.67%	4.95%	4.66%	5.02%	0.55%	15.55%	3.65%	16.95%
Vlorë County		31.93%	6.32%	1.12%	17.56%	0.30%	21.73%	8.30%	12.73%

Population of Albania according to religious group 1923–2023
Religion group	census 1923		census 1927		census 1942		census 2011		census 2023	
Religion group	Number	%	Number	%	Number	%	Number	%	Number	%
Sunni Muslim ^{‡}	558,000	68.5	563,729	67.6	599,912	54.2	1,587,608	56.7	1,101,718	45.86
Bektashism	558,000	68.5	563,729	67.6	163,811	14.7	58,628	2.09	115,644	4.81
Muslim	558,000	68.5	563,729	67.6	763.723	68.9	1.646.236	58.79	1.217.362	50.67
Catholic Christian	85,000	10.5	88,739	10.6	113,891	10.3	280,921	10.0	201,530	8.38
Orthodox Christian	171,000	20.5	181,051	21.7	229,080	20.7	188,992	6.75^{§}	173,645	7.22^{§}
Evangelical							5,616	0.2	9,658	0.4
Christian	256,000	31	269.790	32.3	342.971	31	475.529	16.77	384.833	16
Atheists							69,995	2.5	85,311	3.55
Believers without religion/denomination^{†}							153,630	5.49	332,155	13.82
Non-religious							223,625	8.0	417,466	17.37
Not stated / other			99	0.01	156	0.01	454,046	16.2	382,452	15.91
TOTAL	814,000	100	833,613	100	1,106,850	100	2,800,138	100	2,402,113	100

Notes

- ^{†} Unaffiliated believers: corresponds to the census category “I don’t belong to any religion, but I am a believer”, as defined in the 2011 and 2023 Population and Housing Censuses of Albania.
- ^{‡} Sunni Muslim (aggregate category): for the 2011 and 2023 censuses this category includes all respondents who declared themselves simply as “Muslim” in the census question on religion, in addition to those who identified with the Sunni Muslim community, and excludes only those who explicitly identified as Bektashi. Survey research by the Pew Research Center on religious affiliation in Albania reports that about 65% of Muslims in the country describe themselves as “just a Muslim” rather than as Sunni or Shia, even though the largest organised Muslim community in Albania is the Sunni Muslim community.
- ^{§} Census dispute and underreporting: The official figures for the Orthodox Christian population (6.75% in 2011; 7.22% in 2023) are strongly contested by the Albanian Orthodox Autocephalous Church, which considers them fundamentally incorrect and unacceptable. The Church attributes the low percentage to alleged methodological problems, including the fact that the question on religion was optional and that many Orthodox believers were supposedly counted in the large "Not stated / other" category, and has at times suggested that a considerable share of respondents recorded as atheists or unaffiliated believers are in reality Orthodox Christians. However, making questions on religion and similar sensitive characteristics voluntary, or allowing respondents not to answer them, follows long-standing census recommendations of the United Nations and European statistical bodies rather than constituting a methodological irregularity. Independent demographic analyses also note that no empirical evidence (from surveys, administrative data or other sources) has been provided to substantiate the claim that most atheists or unaffiliated believers are misclassified Orthodox Christians, and argue that a substantial part of the decline from historical levels (e.g. 20.7% in 1942) reflects genuine demographic change, particularly historically high emigration and lower fertility among Orthodox Christians compared with other groups. A similar long-term decline is also visible among Bektashis (from 14.7% of the population in 1923 to about 2.1% in 2011 and 4.8% in 2023), which points to broader patterns of emigration, urbanisation and secularisation affecting historically concentrated religious communities.

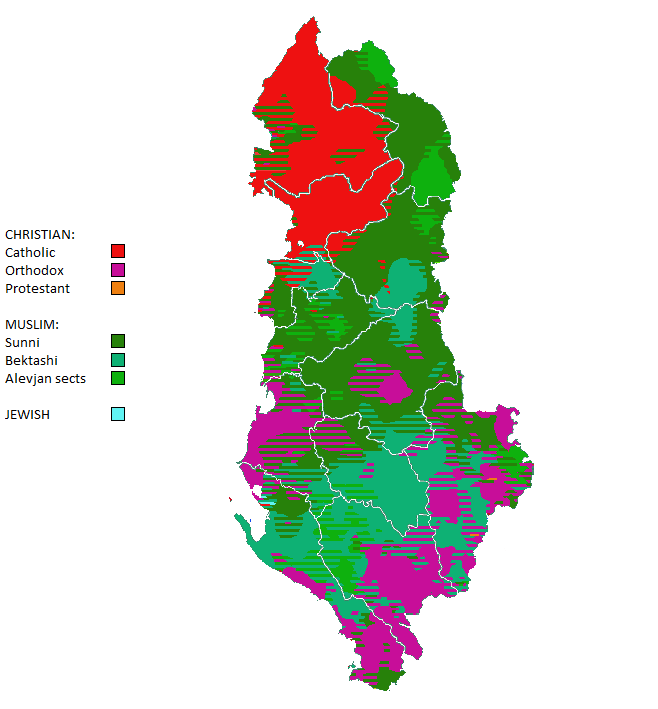
Traditional distribution of religions in Albania Green: Sunnis; Teal: Bektashis; Light Green: Other Shiite tarikats Red: Catholics; Magenta: Orthodox; Orange: Other Christians Light Blue: Jews and other

From 1923 to 2023 the Muslim share declines from 68.5% to 50.67%, with Sunni identification falling after 2011 and Bektashi rising from 2.09% in 2011 to 4.81% in 2023; Christians decrease from about 31% to 16% overall, with Catholics dropping from 10.0% in 2011 to 8.38% in 2023, Orthodox remaining close to their 2011 level at 6.75% to 7.22% and Evangelicals growing from 0.2% to 0.4%. Between 2011 and 2023 the resident population falls from 2,800,138 to 2,402,113 (−398,025); in absolute terms Muslims decline by 428,874 (Sunnis −485,890, Bektashi +57,016) and Christians by 90,696 (Catholics −79,391, Orthodox −15,347, Evangelicals +4,042), while Believers without religion/denomination increase by 178,525 (153,630 → 332,155) and atheists by 15,316 (69,995 → 85,311). The combined non-religious total (atheists plus believers without denomination or religion) increased from 223,625 (8.0%) in 2011 to 417,466 (17.37%) in 2023, during a period of overall population decline.

In a census performed before World War II, a rough distribution of the population was 70% Muslim, 20% Eastern Orthodox, and 10% Catholic. 65% of Albanian Muslims did not associate with particular sect of Islam in a Pew survey. In 1967, religious practices were officially banned in Albania, making the country the first and only constitutionally atheist state to ever exist. After the fall of state communism, in 1991 religious activities resumed. Among people who follow any of the four major religions in Albania, there is a mixture of various religious traditions and pagan traditions coming from the time before Christianity.

Religious practice among Albanians (UNDP 2018)
1. Practises religion (37.3%)
2. Does not practise religion (62.7%)

However, even among those who declared themselves to be adherents of a religion, the majority of the population in Albania has a more secular interpretation of religion than that which would be found in other countries. In August 2012, a Pew Research study found that only 15% of the Muslim population for example, considers religion to be a very important factor in their lives, which was the lowest percentage in the world amongst countries with significant Muslim populations. Another survey conducted by Gallup Global Reports 2010 shows that religion plays a role to 39% of Albanians, and lists Albania as the thirteenth least religious country in the world. According to research Albania is unique regarding the lower than expected practice of circumcision as, as 36.8% of males are circumcised. Even among Muslims, the rate is 46.5%, while among Bektashis it is lower at 21%. This contrasts with the near-universal practice of circumcision as Islamic custom among Muslims worldwide.

Between 2018 and 2024, religious engagement among young people in Albania declined significantly according to the FES Youth Studies. In 2018, 31.3% of youth never attended religious services or did not belong to a religion, and by 2024, this figure had risen to 43.7%. Regular attendance (at least once a month) dropped from 18.3% to 11.0%, while occasional attendance (less than once a month) decreased from 50.3% to 45.3%.

Attendance of religious services by young people (ages 14-29) in Albania, 2024	%
"Never/Do not belong to a religion"	43.7
"Less than once a month"	45.3
"At least once a month"	11.0

A 2022 poll commissioned by Euronews Albania showed that 50.7% in Albania never visit go to religious places of worship, 27.6% visit them only for religious festivities and 19.2% visit them at least once a month.

=== Beliefs and rituals data ===
According to a WIN/Gallup International study in 2016 about the beliefs of the Albanians:

- 80% believed there's God
- 40% believed in life after death
- 57% believed that people have a soul
- 40% believed in hell
- 42% believed in heaven

In the World Values Survey wave 6 (2017-2022) Albania had the lowest belief in life after death in Europe at 22.7%.

Believe in life after death (World Values Survey, 2017)	%
Yes	22.7
No	57.9
Don't know	19.0
No answer	0.4

A 2024 survey by the Institute for Democracy and Mediation asked about ritual practice in Albania giving the below results:

Practice of religious rituals in Albania (2024 IDM poll)	%
"YES, I regularly practise all rituals of my religion"	10.5
"Mainly YES, I practise the main religious rituals":	30.3
"NO, I am a believer, but I do not practise religious rituals at all"	44.2
"NO, I am an atheist"	5.6
"Refused to say"	8.9
"Other"	0.5

According to the 2024 survey by the Konrad Adenauer Foundation (KAS) regarding Ramadan:

- 16.4% fast regularly during Ramadan
- 21.1% fast occasionally during Ramadan
- 62.1% do not fast during Ramadan

Further more, according to the same survey regarding the practice of religious rites during the period when religion was banned in Albania:

- 38.7% stated that they or their parents/grandparents continued to practice religious rites secretly
- 50.8% stated that they did not
- 10.6% said they did not know

=== Interfaith marriages ===
Interfaith marriages between Muslims and Christians are common and seen as "unremarkable" in Albania. During the communist period, it is known that during 1950–1968 the rates of mixed background marriages ranged from 1.6% in Shkodër, 4.3% in Gjirokastër, to 15.5% among textile workers in Tiranë. In the district of Shkodër they reached 5% in 1980. The December 2024 KAS survey found that 79% of respondents had no problem with a family member (including themselves) marrying or cohabiting with someone from a family of a different religious background; such marriages and partnerships represented 21.5% of all unions in their survey. A 2024 national survey by the Institute for Democracy and Mediation reported that 59.9% would certainly support a family member marrying someone of another religion, 19.6% would accept it but not encourage it, 5.1% would object if the spouse is a practicing believer, and 4.5% would object in any case (7.4% were unsure; 3.5% refused to answer).

=== Places of worship ===
According to 2008 statistics from the religious communities in Albania, there are 1,119 churches and 638 mosques in the country. The Catholic mission declared 694 Catholic churches. The Christian Orthodox community, 425 Orthodox churches. The Muslim community, 568 mosques, and 70 Bektashi tekkes.

== Freedom of religion ==
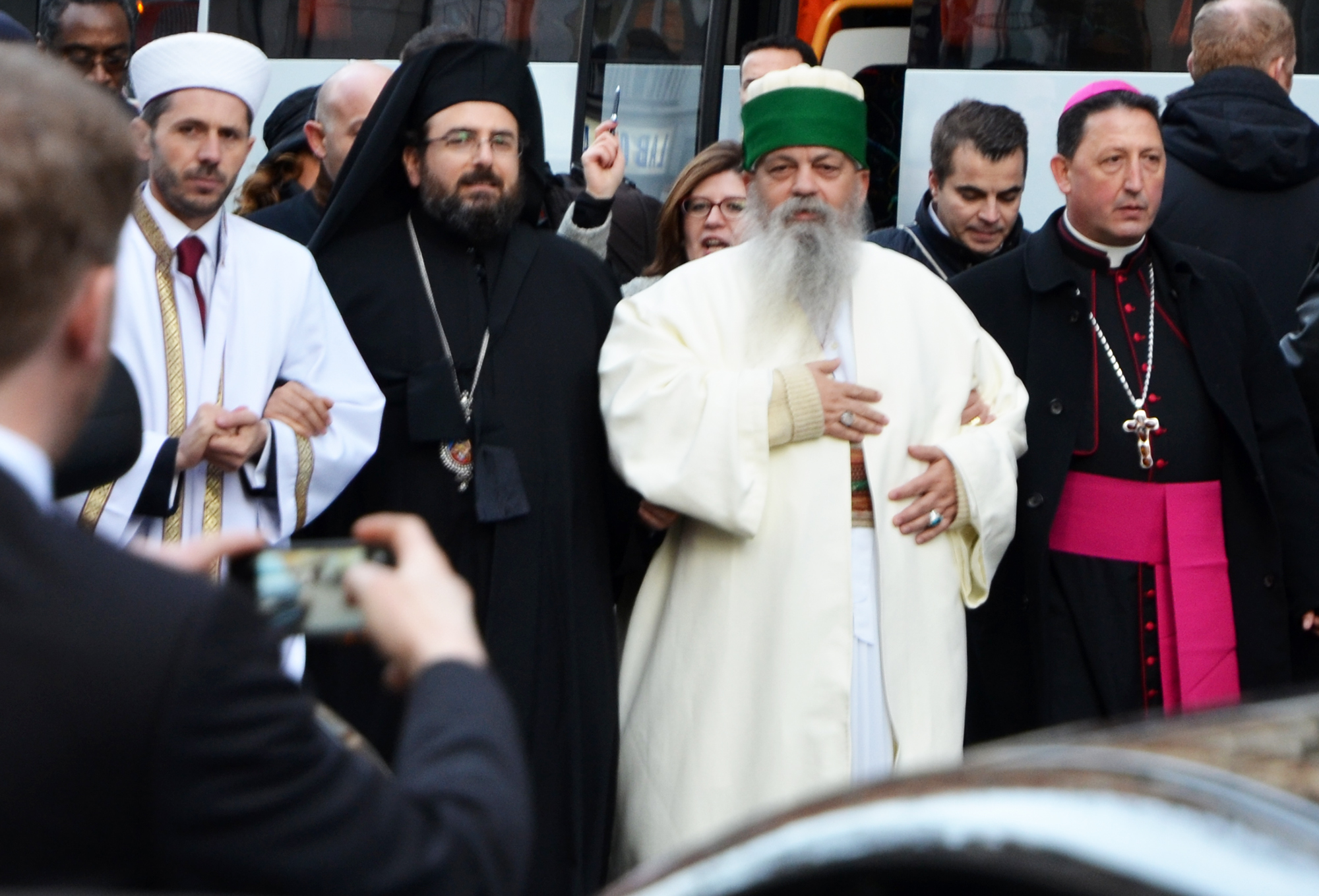
Leaders of Albania's four main denominations in 2015 in Paris in response to the Charlie Hebdo attack

The Constitution extends freedom of religion to all citizens and the government generally respects this right in practice. The Albanian Constitution declares no official religion and provides for equality of all religions; however, the predominant religious communities (Bektashi, Sunni Muslim, Catholic and Orthodox) enjoy a greater degree of official recognition (e.g. national holidays) and social status based on their historical presence in the country. All registered religious groups have the right to hold bank accounts and to own property and buildings. Religious freedoms have in large part been secured by the generally amicable relationship among religions. The Ministry of Education has the right to approve the nonreligious curricula of religious schools to ensure their compliance with national education standards. There are also 113 educational institutions managed by religious communities.

Government policy and practice contributed to the generally free exercise of religion. The government is secular and the Ministry of Education asserts that public schools in the country are secular and that the law prohibits ideological and religious indoctrination. Religious history and comparative religion may be taught in the context of humanities instruction in public schools, while private schools are allowed to teach religious instruction.

== See also ==
- Secularism in Albania

=== Religions ===
- Christianity in Albania
- Catholic Church in Albania
- Orthodoxy in Albania
- Islam in Albania
- Protestantism in Albania
- Irreligion in Albania
- Judaism in Albania

== Sources ==
- Anamali, Skënder; Prifti, Kristaq (2002). Historia e popullit shqiptar në katër vëllime. Botimet Toena. ISBN 978-99927-1-622-9. (in Albanian)
- Boehm, Eric H. (1994). Historical Abstracts: Modern history abstracts, 1450-1914. Clio Press.
- Crampton, Richard J. (2014). The Balkans since the Second World War. Hoboken: Routledge. ISBN 9781317891178.
- Fischer, Bernd J. (1999). Albania at War, 1939–1945. Purdue University Press. ISBN 978-155753141-4.
- Lloshi, Xhevat (2008). Rreth Alfabetit te Shqipes. Logos. ISBN 9789989582684.
- Wilkes, J.J. (1995). The Illyrians. Wiley-Blackwell. ISBN 0-631-19807-5.
