= Albanian Church =

Albanian Church or Church of Albania can refer to any of the following churches:

- the Church of Caucasian Albania, an ancient, briefly autocephalous church established in the 5th century. In 705, It fell under the religious jurisdiction of the Armenian Apostolic Church as the Catholicosate of Aghvank centered in Caucasian Albania, a region spanning present-day northern Azerbaijan and southern Dagestan
- the Albanian Orthodox Church, an autocephalous Eastern Orthodox church in present-day Albania. It declared its autocephaly in 1922, and gained recognition from the Patriarch of Constantinople in 1937
- the Albanian Greek Catholic Church or Albanian Byzantine Catholic Church, an Eastern Catholic church of the Byzantine Rite in Albania
- the Italo-Albanian Catholic Church, an Eastern Catholic church of Byzantine-rite Italo-Albanians in Italy

== See also ==
- Albanian Catholic Church, disambiguation
- Catholic Church in Albania, incorporating all communities and institutions of the Catholic Church in Albania
- Apostolic Administration of Southern Albania, an apostolic administration of the Catholic Church in Albania, covering the southern regions of the country. It has jurisdiction over all Catholics on its territory, both of Latin and Byzantine rites
