= Caritas Albania =

Albanian social welfare and relief organisation

- Caritas Shqiptar
- Established: 1993; 33 years ago
- Type: Nonprofit
- Location: Tirana, Albania
- Coordinates: 41.3349°N 19.8064°E
- Region served: Albania
- Services: development aid, humanitarian relief, social services
- Official language: Albanian, English
- President: Archbishop Arjan Dodaj
- Director: Juljana Reso
- Affiliations: Caritas Internationalis, Caritas Europa
- Website: caritasalbania.org

Caritas Albania (Albanian: Caritas Shqiptar) is an Albanian Catholic not-for-profit social welfare and humanitarian relief organisation. It is a service of the Albanian Bishops' Conference.

Caritas Albania is a member of both Caritas Europa and Caritas Internationalis.

== History ==
In 1993, two years after the fall of communism in Albania, the Episcopal Conference of the Albanian Catholic Church founded Caritas Albania as its social and humanitarian arm. On 3 October 1995, it was officially recognized by the Albanian state as a charitable organisation of the Albanian Catholic Church.

In the 1990s, Albania faced a challenging period marked by high levels of unemployment and poverty, along with an influx of hundreds of thousands of refugees from Kosovo in 1998 and 1999. In this context, Caritas Albania provided essential humanitarian aid, including the distribution of goods and making accommodation centres available, and supported impoverished individuals in becoming legal landowners.

Since 1994, Caritas Albania has been a member of Caritas Internationalis and Caritas Europa, the global network of Catholic aid organisations.

== Work ==
Caritas Albania implements a wide range of activities. In the field of humanitarian action, it supports communities after local or country-wide emergencies, including after floods such as the large-scale 2006 Albania floods, the 2008 Gërdec explosions and the 2019 Albania earthquake.

Since the 2015 European migrant crisis, Caritas Albania has been providing support to refugees, asylum-seekers, and migrants arriving in Albania. As of 2024, the organisation is a partner of UNHCR and maintains a presence at two border points, in Korça and in Gjirokastra, to provide translation and counselling services. Caritas staff identify the vulnerabilities and specific needs of the individuals arriving, such as healthcare requirements, and help them meet these needs.

Another important pillar is the provision of social services for Albanians. Caritas Albania has been building healthcare facilities and provides services to vulnerable persons, including persons with disabilities and Roma people.

== Structure ==
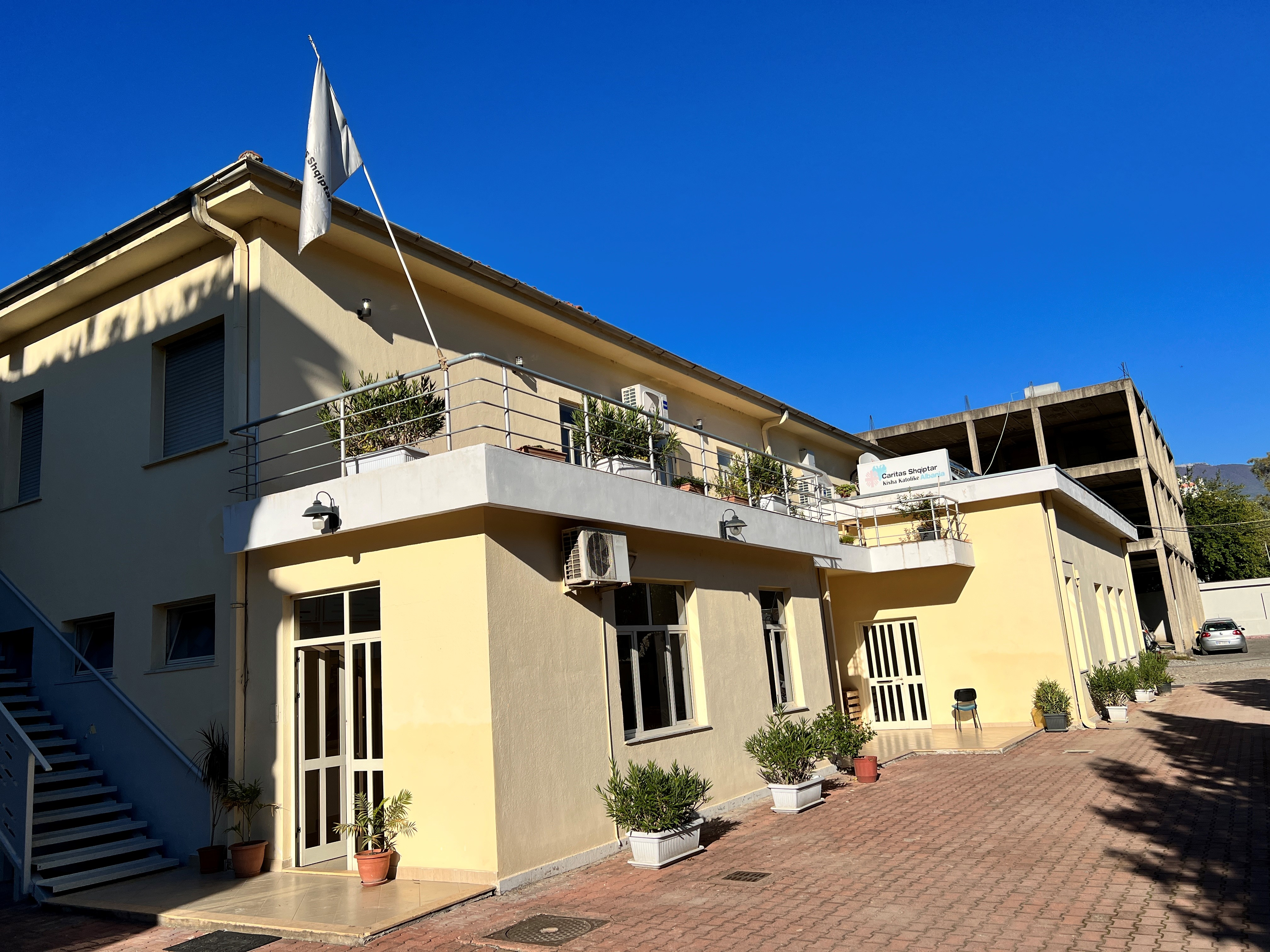
The national office of Caritas Albania in Tirana.

Caritas Albania is a network that consists of the national office located in Tirana as well as of six diocesan Caritas organisations:

- Caritas Tirana-Durrës
- Caritas Shkodra-Pult
- Caritas Sapa
- Caritas Lezha
- Caritas Rrëshen
- Caritas Jugu (South)

In addition, Caritas works through 95 referral missions throughout Albania.

== Presidents ==
- 1994-2000: Rrok Mirdita
- around 2002: Dode Gjergji
- ??-2017: Gjergj Frendo
- 2017-2022: Angelo Massafra
- since 2022: Archbishop Arjan Dodaj
