= Episcopal Conference of Albania =

Assembly of Catholic bishops

- Konferenca Ipeshkvnore e Shqipërisë
- Abbreviation: KISH
- Type: Episcopal Conference
- Headquarters: Tirana
- Official language: Albanian and Latin
- President: Gjergj Meta Bishop of Rrëshen
- Parent organization: Holy See
- Affiliations: Council of European Bishops' Conferences, Commission of Bishops' Conferences of the European Union, Catholic Bishops' Bioethics Committee
- Website: kish.al

The Albanian Bishops' Conference (Albanian: Konferenca Ipeshkvnore e Shqipërisë; Latin: Conferentia Episcopalis Albaniæ, KISH) is an episcopal conference of the Catholic Church in Albania. The conference is organized by Archbishop Angelo Massafra, Archbishop and Metropolitan of Shkodrë-Pult conducted. It is a member of the Council of European Episcopal Conferences (CCEE).

== Members ==
Active Prelates:

- Giovanni Peragine B, Archbishop of Shkodrë-Pult
- Arjan Dodaj FDC, Archbishop of Tiranë-Durrës
- Gjergj Meta, Bishop of Rrëshen
- Ottavio Vitale RCJ, Bishop of Lezhë
- Flavio Cavallini OFM, Apostolic Administrator of Southern Albania

Retired Prelates:

- George Anthony Frendo OP, Archbishop emeritus of Tiranë-Durrës
- Angelo Massafra OFM, Archbishop emeritus of Shkodrë-Pult
- Cristoforo Palmieri CM, Bishop emeritus of Rrëshen
- Hil Kabashi OFM, Apostolic Administrator emeritus of Southern Albania

Not part of the Conference:

- Cardinal Ernest Simoni

== See also ==
- Catholic Church in Albania
- Mother Teresa
