= Ottavio Vitale =

Italian Roman Catholic prelate (born 1959)

The Most Reverend Ottavio Vitale RCJ
- Bishop of Lezhë
- Church: Roman Catholic Church
- Appointed: 23 November 2005
- Installed: 6 January 2006
- Predecessor: Dodë Gjergji
- Other post: Apostolic Administrator of Lezhë (2000–2005)

Orders
- Ordination: 27 June 1992 by Benigno Luigi Papa
- Consecration: 6 January 2006 by Angelo Massafra

Personal details
- Born: Ottavio Vitale; 5 February 1959 (age 67) Grottaglie, Italy
- Education: Pontifical Lateran University
- Motto: Rogate Dominum messis
- Coat of arms

Ottavio Vitale RCJ (born 5 February 1959) is an Italian-born Albanian Roman Catholic prelate who has served as the Bishop of Lezhë in Albania since 2005. He is a member of the Rogationists of the Heart of Jesus.

== Early life and education ==
Ottavio Vitale was born on 5 February 1959 in Grottaglie, Italy. He entered the Congregation of the Rogationist Fathers in 1983. He made his novitiate in the Philippines and later pursued higher studies in Rome, where he obtained a licentiate in Pastoral Theology from the Pontifical Lateran University.

He was ordained a priest on 27 June 1992. Shortly after his ordination, he served as the head of the Rogationist minor seminary in Trani, Italy.

== Mission in Albania ==
In 1993, Vitale was sent to Albania to serve as the superior and spiritual father of the minor seminary in Shënkoll, within the Diocese of Lezhë. He was named Diocesan Administrator of Lezhë in 1998 and was subsequently appointed Apostolic Administrator of the same see on 5 February 2000.

== Episcopal ministry ==
On 23 November 2005, Pope Benedict XVI appointed Vitale as the Bishop of Lezhë. He received his episcopal consecration on 6 January 2006 from Archbishop Angelo Massafra.

As bishop, Vitale has been an active member of the Episcopal Conference of Albania, participating in various assemblies regarding the pastoral challenges of the Church in Albania, particularly focusing on youth and vocations. In 2018, he represented the Albanian Church at the Council of the Bishops' Conferences of Europe (CCEE) meeting on vocations held in Tirana, where he discussed the state of religious callings in contemporary Europe.

He is known for his Christmas and Easter messages which often address social issues and the need for spiritual renewal in the Lezhë region.
