= List of Catholic dioceses in Albania =

The Catholic Church in Albania is composed of:

- two Roman Catholic ecclesiastical provinces, comprising two metropolitan archdioceses and three suffragan dioceses
- one pre-diocesan jurisdiction of the Albanian Greek Catholic Church, a particular church sui iuris using the Byzantine Rite Albanian language, comprising only a single Apostolic administration.

== Current Catholic dioceses ==
Ecclesiastical province of Shkodër–Pult: Archdiocese of Shkodër–Pult Diocese of Sapë Diocese of Lezhë Ecclesiastical province of Tiranë-Durrës: Archdiocese of Tiranë–Durrës Diocese of Rrëshen Apostolic Administration of Southern Albania

=== Actual Latin Catholic sees ===
==== Latin Ecclesiastical province of Tiranë-Durrës ====
Ecclesiastical jurisdictions	Latin name	Type	Former name	Established	Area (km^{2})
Rrëshen	Rrësheniensis	Diocese		25 December 1888	3,463
Tiranë–Durrës	Tiranensis–Dyrracenus	Metropolitan Archdiocese		1300	2,263

==== Latin Ecclesiastical province of Shkodër–Pult ====
Ecclesiastical jurisdictions	Latin name	Type	Former name	Established	Area (km^{2})
Lezhë	Alexiensis	Diocese	Alessio	1400	750
Sapë	Sappensis	Diocese		1062	2,544
Shkodër–Pult	Scodrensis–Pulatensis	Metropolitan Archdiocese	Scutari–Pulsi	14 March 1867	2,363

=== Albanian Greek Catholic Church ===
Ecclesiastical jurisdictions	Latin name	Type	Rite	Ecclesiastical province	Established	Area (km^{2})
Southern Albania	Albaniae Meridionalis	Apostolic Administration	Byzantine	Tiranë–Durrës	11 November 1939	16,172

== Defunct Latin jurisdictions ==
=== Titular Latin Catholic sees ===
Ecclesiastical jurisdictions	Latin name	Established
Arbanum (Arbano, Albano)	Arbanensis	1166 (as diocese)
Chunavia (Konavlje)	Chunaviensis	1933
Dagnum (Dagno)	Dagnensis	late 14th century (as diocese)
Phoenice	Phoenicius	1933

- One Metropolitan Titular archbishopric: Achrida
- Titular bishoprics : Amantia (Amanzia), Apollonia, Aulon, Balecium (Balecio / Balezo), Benda, Buthrotum (Butrinto), Craina, Croæ, Drivastum (Drivasto / Drisht), Glavinitza, Hadrianopolis in Epiro, Lestrona, Onchesmus (Onchesmo), Pulcheriopolis, Sarda, Scampa, Stephaniacum (Stefaniaco)

=== Other defunct Latin jurisdictions ===
- Territorial Abbacy of Shën Llezhri i Oroshit, merged into Roman Catholic Diocese of Rrëshen

Several (arch)bishoprics had their title integrated into the merger:

- Roman Catholic Archdiocese of Durrës (Durazzo), merged into Roman Catholic Archdiocese of Tiranë–Durrës
- Roman Catholic Diocese of Pulati, merged into Roman Catholic Archdiocese of Shkodër-Pult
- Roman Catholic Diocese of Shkodër (Shkodrë), merged into Roman Catholic Archdiocese of Shkodër–Pult

== See also ==
- List of Catholic dioceses (structured view)

== Sources and external links ==
- GCatholic.org.
- Catholic-Hierarchy
