= Hil Kabashi =

Albanian Roman Catholic prelate (born 1941)

The Most Reverend Hil Kabashi OFM
- Titular Bishop of Turres in Byzacena, Apostolic Administrator Emeritus of Southern Albania
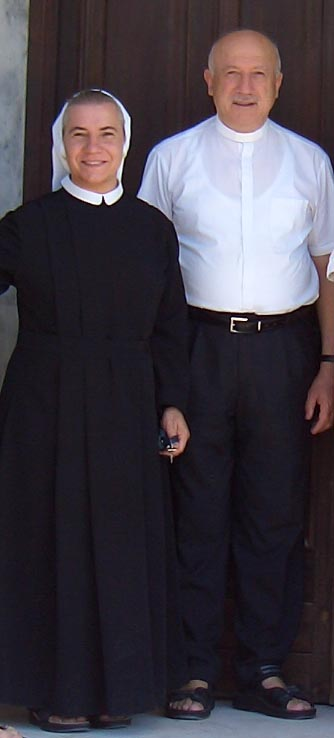
- Bishop Kabashi with Sr. Marta Kabashi in 2006
- Church: Roman Catholic Church
- Appointed: 3 December 1996
- Installed: 6 January 1997
- Term ended: 15 June 2017
- Predecessor: Ivan Dias
- Successor: Giovanni Peragine

Orders
- Ordination: 18 May 1969
- Consecration: 6 January 1997 by Pope John Paul II

Personal details
- Born: Hil Kabashi; 19 February 1941 (age 85) Caparc, Kingdom of Yugoslavia (present-day Kosovo)

Hil Kabashi OFM (born 19 February 1941) is an Albanian Roman Catholic prelate and member of the Order of Friars Minor who served as the Apostolic Administrator of Southern Albania from 1996 until his retirement in 2017.

== Early life and priesthood ==
Hil Kabashi was born in Caparc, near Prizren (present-day Kosovo), in a region then part of the Kingdom of Yugoslavia. He entered the Franciscan Order and completed his theological studies in Zagreb and Graz. He was ordained a priest on 18 May 1969.

Following his ordination, Kabashi served as a chaplain for Albanian emigrants in Germany, specifically in Stuttgart, from 1971 to 1997. During this time, he was active in providing spiritual and pastoral care to the Albanian diaspora.

== Episcopal ministry ==
On 3 December 1996, Pope John Paul II appointed Kabashi as the Apostolic Administrator of Southern Albania and Titular Bishop of Turres in Byzacena. He was consecrated as a bishop by the Pope himself in Saint Peter's Basilica on 6 January 1997.

As Administrator of Southern Albania, Kabashi was responsible for a territory where the majority of Christians belong to the Eastern Orthodox Church, while the Catholic community is predominantly of the Byzantine Rite (Albanian Greek Catholic Church). He worked extensively on the reconstruction of the Church infrastructure and pastoral life in the aftermath of the atheist communist regime.

In 2005, he participated in the XI Ordinary General Assembly of the Synod of Bishops in the Vatican, where he spoke on the importance of the Eucharist in the life of the Church in mission territories.

== Retirement ==
On 15 June 2017, Pope Francis accepted Kabashi's resignation from the pastoral governance of the Apostolic Administration of Southern Albania, having reached the age limit. He was succeeded by Giovanni Peragine, B.
