= Tricomia (Phrygia) =

Tricomia or Trikomia (Ancient Greek: Τρικωμία) was a town in the eastern part of ancient Phrygia, inhabited during Roman and Byzantine times. It was on the road from Dorylaeum to Apamea Cibotus, and is placed by the Peutinger Table at a distance of 28 Roman miles from Midaeum and 21 from Pessinus.

Its site is tentatively located near İlkburun in Asiatic Turkey, by some authors, but left unlocated by others.
