= Flavio Cavallini =

Italian Roman Catholic prelate and biblical theologian (born 1957)

Rev. Flavio Cavallini OFM
- Apostolic Administrator of Southern Albania
- Church: Roman Catholic Church
- Appointed: 25 April 2026
- Predecessor: Giovanni Peragine

Orders
- Ordination: 16 June 1984

Personal details
- Born: Flavio Cavallini; 12 August 1957 (age 69) Verona, Italy
- Education: Studium Biblicum Franciscanum

Flavio Cavallini OFM (born 12 August 1957) is an Italian Roman Catholic prelate and biblical theologian who has served as the Apostolic Administrator of Southern Albania since April 2026. A member of the Order of Friars Minor (Franciscans), he previously served as the parish priest of Saint Anthony in Tirana.

== Early life and education ==
Flavio Cavallini was born on 12 August 1957 in Verona, Italy. He entered the Franciscan Order and underwent his initial formation at the San Bernardino Inter-Provincial Theological Studium in Verona, where he completed his studies in philosophy and theology.

He later moved to Jerusalem to continue his intellectual and spiritual formation at the Studium Biblicum Franciscanum, where he obtained a licentiate in biblical theology. He was ordained a priest on 16 June 1984.

== Ministry in Albania ==
Cavallini moved to Albania in 1993, shortly after the fall of the communist regime, to assist in the reconstruction of the local Catholic Church. He became a prominent figure in the Albanian Franciscan Province, serving as Provincial Minister for three terms.

In Tirana, he served as the parish priest of the Church of Saint Anthony (Shna Ndou), a significant center of pilgrimage. He also founded and directed Vatra Biblike (Biblical Hearth), a service of the Archdiocese of Tirana-Durrës dedicated to biblical formation and promoting Christian experience in the capital.

== Apostolic Administrator ==
On 25 April 2026, Pope Leo XIV appointed Cavallini as the Apostolic Administrator of Southern Albania. He succeeded Bishop Giovanni Peragine, who previously was transferred to the Archdiocese of Shkodër-Pult. Also it was announced in his appointment, that he will serve without the episcopal rank, meaning, that he remains a priest.

The Apostolic Administration of Southern Albania is an ecclesiastical jurisdiction that serves the small Catholic minority (mostly of the Byzantine Rite) in the southern half of the country.
