= Giovanni Peragine =

Italian-born Albanian Roman Catholic prelate (born 1965)

The Most Reverend Giovanni Peragine B.
- Archbishop of Shkodër-Pult
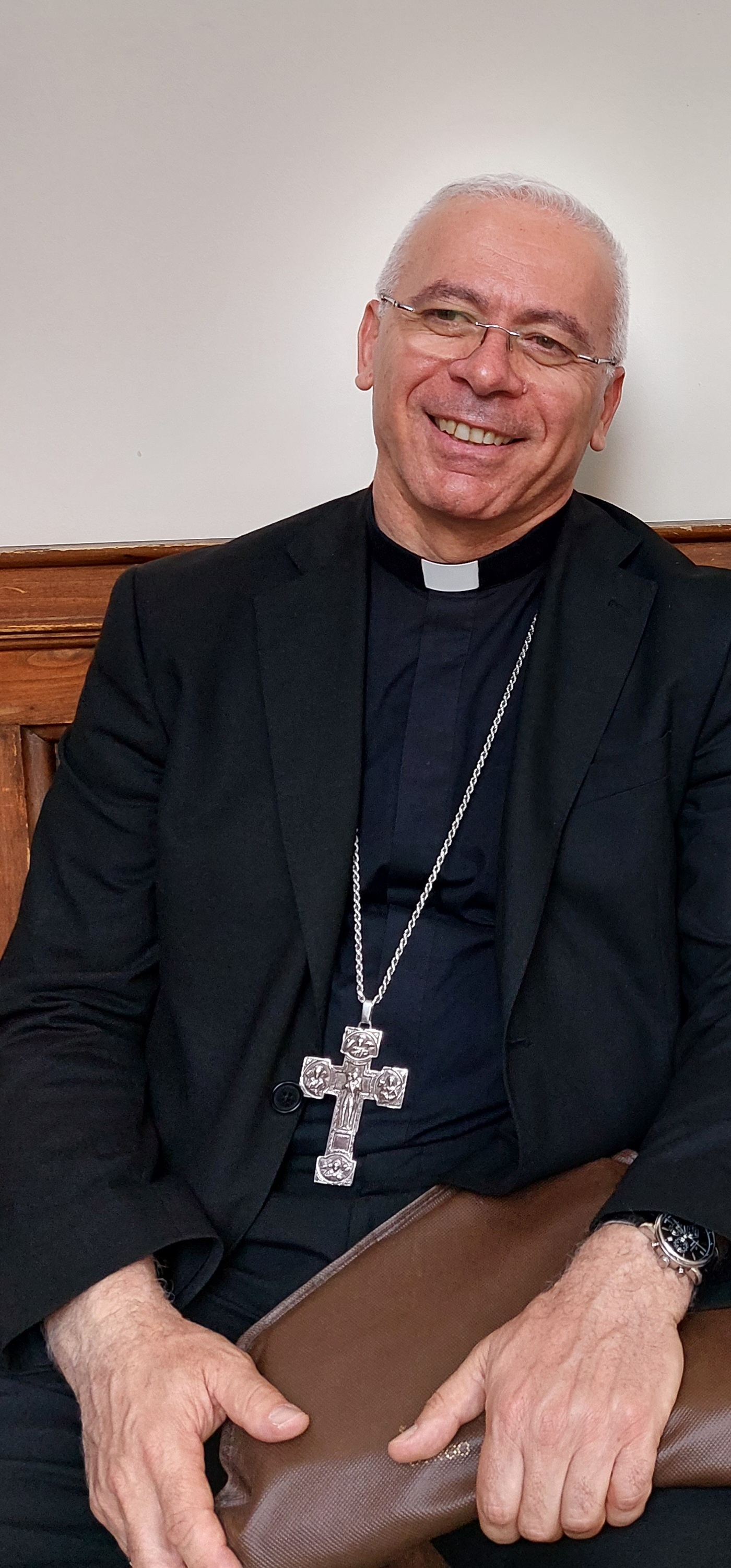
- Church: Roman Catholic Church
- Appointed: 8 January 2025
- Predecessor: Angelo Massafra
- Other post: Vice-President of the Episcopal Conference of Albania (2021–2024)
- Previous posts: Apostolic Administrator of Southern Albania and Titular Bishop of Phoenice (2017–2024), Coadjutor Archbishop of Shkodër-Pult (2024–2025)

Orders
- Ordination: 20 March 1993
- Consecration: 7 September 2017 by George Anthony Frendo

Personal details
- Born: Giovanni Peragine; 25 June 1965 (age 61) Altamura, Italy
- Education: Pontifical Urban University
- Motto: Pasce agnos meos
- Coat of arms

Giovanni Peragine B. (born 25 June 1965) is an Italian-born Albanian Roman Catholic prelate and member of the Barnabites (Clerics Regular of St. Paul). He has served as the Archbishop of Shkodër-Pult since January 2025. He previously served as a Coadjutor Archbishop of the Archdiocese from 2024 to 2025, the Apostolic Administrator of Southern Albania and Titular Bishop of Phoenice from 2017 to 2024.

== Early life and priesthood ==
Giovanni Peragine was born on 25 June 1965 in Altamura, Apulia, Italy. He entered the Clerics Regular of Saint Paul and made his perpetual profession on 17 November 1991. He was ordained a priest on 20 March 1993, after the philosophical and theological studies at the Pontifical Urban University in Rome, where he obtained a bachelor's degree in philosophy and theology and a licentiate in Biblical Theology.

In 1998, Peragine moved to Albania to serve as a missionary. He held various positions within the Barnabite mission in Milot and served as the President of the Albanian Conference of Major Superiors and the President of the Union of European Conferences of Major Superiors (UCESM).

== Episcopal ministry ==
On 15 June 2017, Pope Francis appointed Peragine as the Apostolic Administrator of Southern Albania and Titular Bishop of Phoenice. He was consecrated on 7 September 2017 by Archbishop George Anthony Frendo. During his tenure, he focused on the integration of the Latin and Byzantine Rites in Southern Albania and the revitalization of the small Catholic communities in the region, because this ecclesiastical jurisdiction is serving to the small Catholic minority (mostly of the Albanian Greek Catholic Church) in the southern half of the country.

In February 2021, he was elected Vice-President of the Episcopal Conference of Albania, and on 20 May 2024, he was appointed by Pope Francis as a Coadjutor Archbishop of the Archdiocese of Shkodër-Pult.

On 8 January 2025, he succeeded his predecessor, Archbishop Angelo Massafra as the Metropolitan Archbishop of the Roman Catholic Archdiocese of Shkodër-Pult.
