= Tamerza =

Coordinates: 34°22′48″N 7°57′00″E

Tamaghza تمغرة Tamerza
- Oasis Town
- Tamaghza
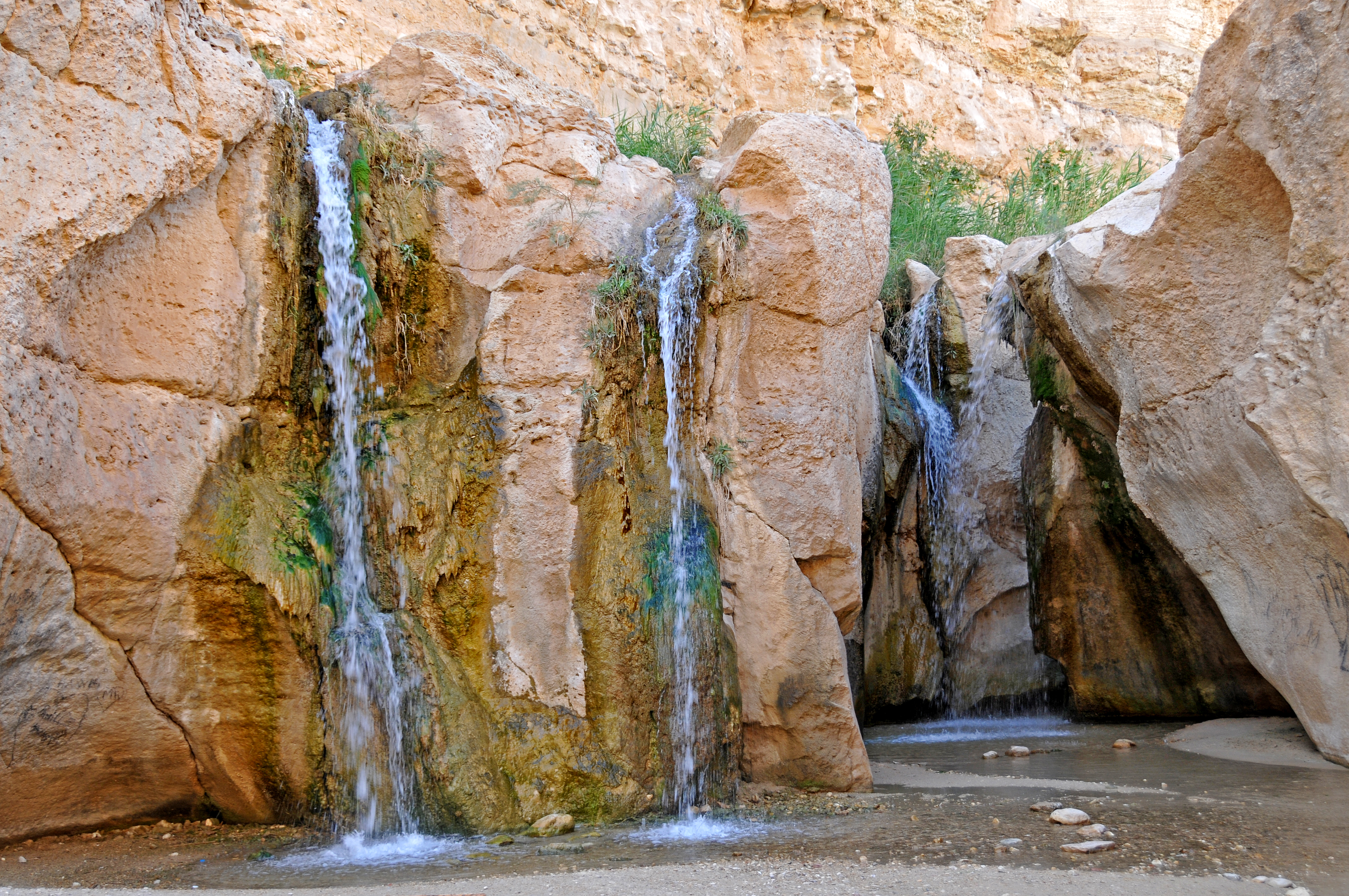

- Location within Tunisia
- Country: Tunisia
- Governorate: Tozeur Governorate

Tamerza (or Tamaghza, Arabic: تمغرة) is the largest mountain oasis in Tunisia, known as Ad Turres by the Romans. It has a canyon and an abandoned old town. The town was abandoned after the river flooded for 22 days in 1969. It is located north of the salt lakes and receives fresh water from the nearby hills. It is in the hillcountry near the border with Algeria, and is 6 km (3.7 mi) from Mides.

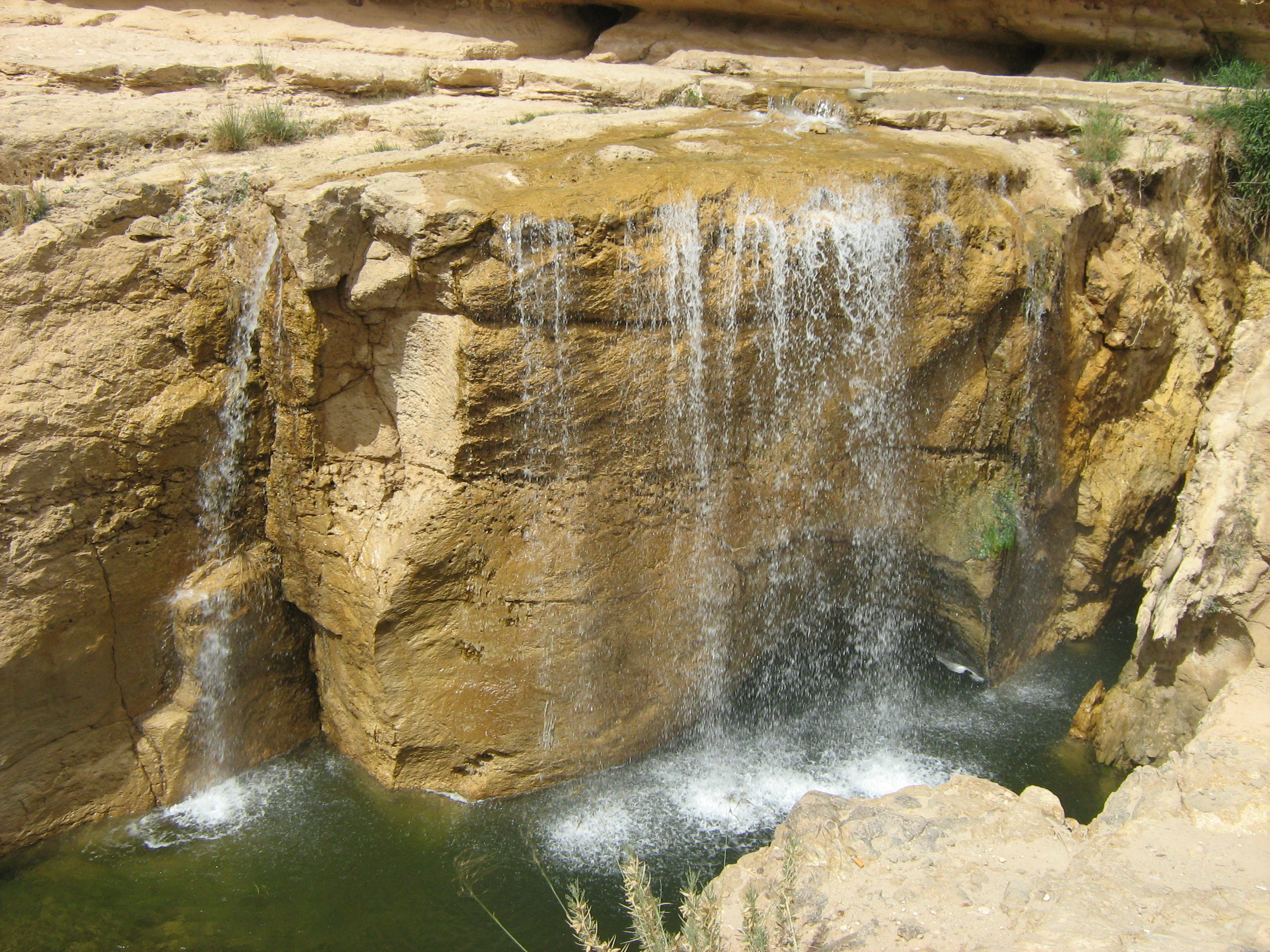
Tamarza

Tamarza is located close to the Algerian border, 70 km from Tozeur. Tamerza is surrounded by steep and wild area country and is renowned for its clear water cascades and springs that irrigate the towns park.
