= Roman Catholic Diocese of Budua =

Catholic titular see in Montenegro

The Roman Catholic Diocese of Budua was a Latin Catholic bishopric with see in Budva, in Montenegro, which existed from circa 1200 till 1829. It has been a titular see since 1933.

== History ==
Established circa 1200 as Diocese of Budua (Latine and Italian) without direct precursor, but its territory formerly was under the Ancient Metropolitan Archdiocese of Doclea.

On 27 February 1532, Pope Clement VII appointed James Dalmas the bishop of Ulcinj. Dalmas was also a bishop of Budva, and the Roman Catholic Diocese of Budua was effectively merged into the Diocese of Budua.

Suppressed on 1828.06.30, its territory being merged into the Roman Catholic Diocese of Kotor (Cattaro).

=== Episcopal Ordinaries ===
(all Roman Rite; presumably incomplete)

Suffragan Bishops of Budua

- (first unavailable)
- Incelerio Prodić, Augustinians (O.E.S.A.) (1273?–1299?)
- Giovanni (1330?–1331?)
- Pietro (?–1343?)
- Enrico (1344?–1346?)
- Giovanni Luciani, Friars Minor (O.F.M.) (1360–?)
- Guglielmo, Dominican Order (O.P.) (1379–?)
- Alberto (1381? – death 1384?)
- Giovanni Egret, O.F.M. (1386.02.26 – ?)
- Otto Roder, O.P. (1401.12.23 – ?)
- Giovanni, O.P. (1433.03.23 – ?)
- Johann Schedemecker, O.E.S.A. (1438.06.27 – death 1452.03.14)
- Giovanni Rubini, O.E.S.A. (1446.11.21 – 1447.09.20), later Bishop of Korcula (Croatia) (1447.09.20 – ?)
- Giovanni de Breberio, O.F.M. (1447.10.16 – ?)
- Joannes de Wernigerode, O.P. (1484.04.07 – ?)
- Simone Boschetti (1518.05.05 – ?)
- Gonzalo Carvajal (1524.05.20 – ?)
- Giacomo de Medro, O.F.M. (1530.10.03 – 1536?)
- Leonardo Lave (1546.05.05 – ?)
- Antonio Ciurlit (1558.02.04 – ?)
- Francesco Cruta (1634.01.07 – ?), later Bishop of Scutari (Shkodrë, Albania) (1640.09.10 – death 1645?)
- Giovanni Bactuta (1646.07.05 – ?)
- Giovanni Markević (1648.10.15 – ?)
- Andrija Zmajević (1670.12.23 – death 1694.09.07), also Metropolitan Archbishop of Bar (Montenegro) (1671.02.23 – 1694.09.07)
- Marino Drago (1696.07.07 – ?), also Bishop of Kotor (Cattaro) (Montenegro) (1688.05.31 – 1708.10.03), Apostolic Administrator of Scutari (Shkodrë, Albania)) (1690.02.11 – 1693.12.22), Bishop of Korcula (Croatia) (1708.10.03 – 1733.10.09)

== Titular see ==
In 1933 the diocese was nominally restored as Titular bishopric of Budua, of the lowest (episcopal) rank.

It has had the following incumbents, of the fitting episcopal rank:

BIOS to ELABORATE

- Victorino Cristobal Ligot (1969.02.12 – 1970.02.06)
- Louis-Bertrand Tirilly, Picpus Fathers (SS.CC.) (1970.03.17 – 1976.09.27)
- António José Rafael Rafael (1976.12.02 – 1979.02.26)
- Ruben T. Profugo (1979.08.27 – 1982.05.15)
- Eustaquio Pastor Cuquejo Verga, Redemptorists (C.SS.R.) (1982.06.27 – 1990.04.19) (later Archbishop)
- Fabio de Jesús Morales Grisales, (C.SS.R.) (1991.04.15 – 1999.10.29)
- Jorge García Isaza, Lazarists (C.M.) (2000.02.17 – 2016.08.16)
- Socrates Mesiona, Mission Society of the Philippines (M.S.P.) (2016.10.28 – ...), Apostolic Vicar of Puerto Princesa (Philippines)

== Sources and external links ==
- GCatholic, with Google satellite photo
