= Josif Papamihali =

Albanian Catholic priest (1912–1948)

Blessed Josif Papamihali
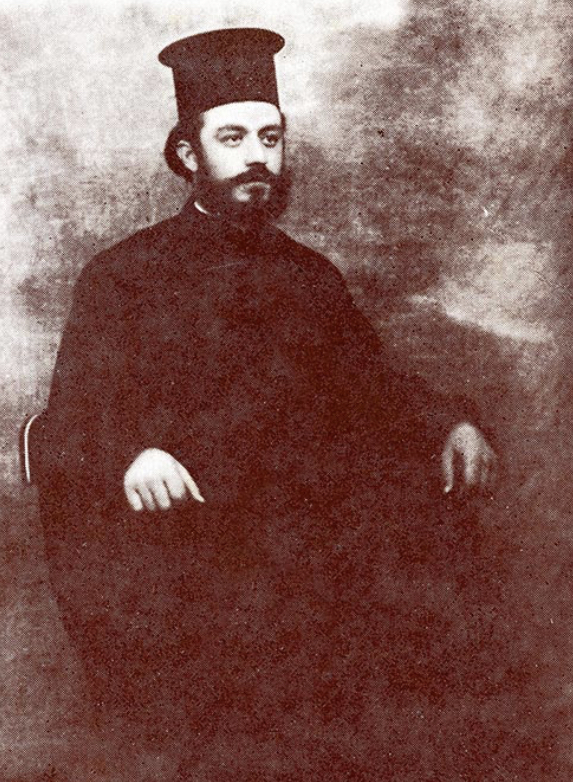
- Born: 23 September 1912; Elbasan, Ottoman Empire (now Elbasan, Albania)
- Died: 26 October 1948 (aged 36); Maliq, Albania
- Cause of death: Exhaustion, buried alive
- Beatified: 5 November 2016 by Francis

Josif Papamihali (23 September 1912 – 26 October 1948), was an Albanian Catholic priest of the Byzantine rite.

== Life ==
Born in Elbasan on September 23, 1912, Papamihali studied Philosophy and Theology in the Pontifical Greek College of Saint Athanasius in Rome, near the Angelicum, where he was ordained a priest on 1 December 1935 by Giovanni Mele, the Italo-Albanian Greek Catholic Church bishop of Lungro and all Byzantine Rite Italo-Albanians on the Italian mainland.

Papamihali returned to a now independent Albania in 1936 and served as a parish priest in Elbasan, Korçë, Berat, Lushnjë, and Pogradec. Beginning in 1944, he became the main superior of the Albanian Greek Catholic Church.

He was arrested by the communist authorities in Korçë on 31 October 1946 and was later convicted as an enemy of the people. On 5 August 1947, Papamihali was sentenced by the courts to 5 years imprisonment and forced labor and was transferred to Korçë and later Maliq where he died. He was buried alive by labour camp guards in a marsh, after he had fallen from exhaustion, on 26 October 1948.

Following the fall of communism in Albania, he was beatified at Shkodër along with thirty-seven other Albanian Catholic martyrs on 5 November 2016.
