= George Germanos =

Albanian archimandrite

George Germanos (in Albanian: Jorgji Germanos, Elbasan, 1858 – April 1929) was a former Albanian Orthodox archimandrite converted to Eastern Catholicism and founder of the Albanian Greek Catholic Church.

== Biography ==
George Germanos was born in Elbasan, Albania, in 1858. He studied literature in Athens and philosophy and theology in Constantinople (now Istanbul). Germanos was ordained a priest by the Orthodox Metropolitan of Cesarea, Efimerios, in 1880. After two years living in Galata, he came back to his native Elbasan to become archimandrite and general vicar of the Metropolitan of Durrës, Bessarion, his uncle. After many attempts to convert many Islamic villages to Orthodoxy, in August 1895 Germanos solicited a union with Catholic Church to face Islam in his homeland and expressed that it was his uncle Bessarion's desire.

Germanos informed the Latin Archbishop of Durrës, Primo Bianchi, his and two village leaders', and 5,000 Albanian Orthodoxes' desire to unite themselves to the Catholic Church. He informed the Elbasan's desire to unite with Rome as surrounding villages, however Rome didn't give an answer to this request. In his letter to Isaias Papadopoulos, Germanos regretted Rome's inactivity and miscommunications in relation to the union of these Orthodox Albanians to Rome. On 18 August 1897 this declaration of union was dispatched to Rome and the Propaganda Fide supported the cause. Rome delayed an answer to this movement of union till 31 March 1900, when formally receive Archimandrite Germanos and twenty Orthodox families in the Catholic Church, and Germanos was named parish priest in Elbasan.

Germanos was persecuted by Orthodox Metropolitan of Durrës, Procopius, and in March 1913, flew away from an attempt of his capture. Essad Pasha Toptani, Albanian minister of Interior, ordered him to be imprisoned and he was arrested in Elbasan and remained eight months in jail, accused of conspiracy. In 1914 he was exiled to Italy by Essad Pasha Toptani's orders and only returned in 1918, however Germanos was in fear of his life, because Procopius offered a reward by his assassination in Albanian lands. He continued with his project to build a church to the Byzantine Catholics of Elbasan and put pression in Rome to do it. Germanos refused an offer made by Procopius with 3,000 Turkish liras and abjuration of union with Catholic Church followed by his departure of Elbasan, and it was an attitude that renewed the faith of these Byzantines united to Catholicism. After that, a garrison of Serbian soldiers, instigated by Procopius, whom accused Germanos to be an Austrian spy, invaded his house and attempted against his life without success.

Germanos considered to be necessary to envoy sisters to give religious instructions in Elbasan to Catholic families and in 1918 remembered Papadopoulos of sad situation of his church at time and in the same year was in Grottaferrata Abbey.

George Germanos died in April 1929; the first church to Albanian Byzantine Catholics was built in August, four months after his death.
