= Roman Catholic Archdiocese of Shkodër–Pult =

Roman Catholic archdiocese in Albania

Coordinates: 42.0654°N 19.5199°E

Archdiocese of Shkodër–Pult Archidioecesis Scodrensis–Pulatensis Kryedioqeza e Shkodrës–Pult

Catholic
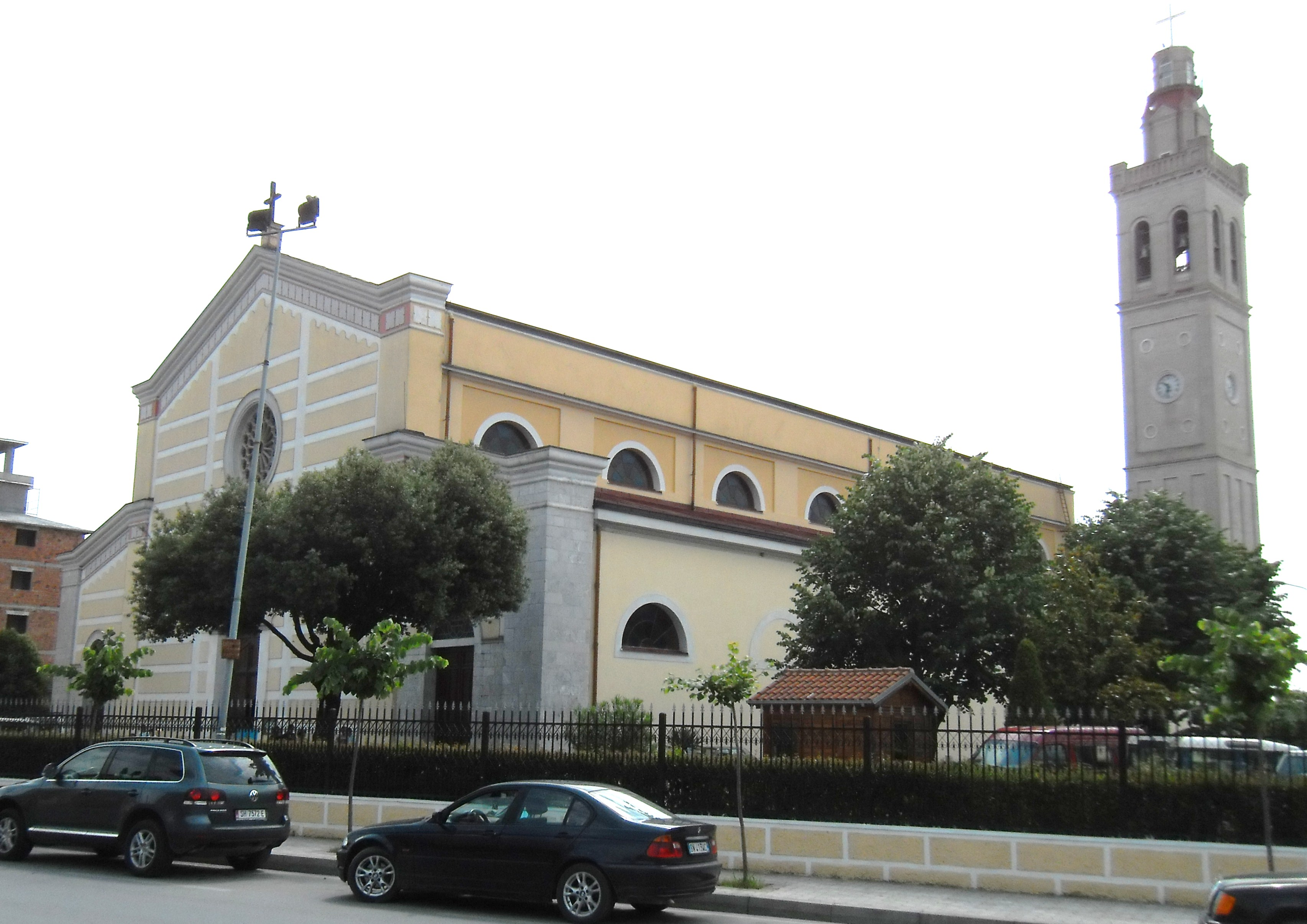
- Metropolitan Cathedral

Location
- Country: Albania

Statistics
- Area: 4,113 km^{2} (1,588 sq mi)
- Population: Total; Catholics: (as of 2014); 238,000; 166,700 (70.0%)
- Parishes: 40

Information
- Denomination: Roman Catholic
- Sui iuris church: Latin Church
- Rite: Roman Rite
- Established: c. 305 (As Diocese of Scutari); 14 March 1867 (As Archdiocese of Shkodrë); 25 January 2005 (As Archdiocese of Shkodrë-Pult)
- Cathedral: The Cathedral of St Stephen in Shkodër
- Secular priests: 55

Current leadership
- Pope: Leo XIV
- Metropolitan Archbishop: Giovanni Peragine
- Suffragans: Diocese of Sapë; Diocese of Lezhë
- Bishops emeritus: Angelo Massafra

Map
- Archdiocese of Shkodër–Pult Suffragan dioceses

Website
- Website of the Archdiocese

The Archdiocese of Shkodër–Pult (Albanian: Kryedioqeza e Shkodrës–Pult, Latin: Archidioecesis Scodrensis–Pulatensis), historically known as Scutari, is one of two Metropolitan archdiocese of the Latin Church of the Catholic Church in Albania.

The archdiocese's cathedral is St. Stephen's Cathedral (Albanian: Katedralja e Shën Shtjefnit Protomartir) in Shkoder, dedicated to St. Stephen Protomartyr.

== Statistics ==
As of 2014, it pastorally served 166,700 Catholics (70.0% of 238,000 total) on 4,113 km^{2} in 40 parishes and 3 missions with 55 priests (21 diocesan, 34 religious), 220 lay religious (62 brothers, 158 sisters), and 9 seminarians.

== Ecclesiastical province ==
The archdiocese has two suffragan sees:

- the Roman Catholic Diocese of Lezhë
- the Roman Catholic Diocese of Sapë.

== History ==
The diocese of Scutari (Shkodrë) was established circa 305. The first known bishop was Bassus (387). The bishops of Scutari were at first subject to the Metropolitan Archbishopric of Thessalonica (Thessaloniki, Greece), Primatial see of all Illyricum, but when Byzantine emperor Justinian I transferred the primacy, they became suffragans of the Archdiocese of Justiniana Prima. In the early Middle Ages Scutari was suffragan of the Archdiocese of Dioclea (now Metropolitan of Bar, in Montenegro). From 1063 to 1886 53 bishops of Scutari are known (none to the middle of the twelfth century).

In 1571 it gained territory from the suppressed diocese of Suacium (Svač, Šas). The ancient diocese of Ulcinium (Ulcinj, Dulcigno), in the territory of Scutari, was, in 1571, occupied by the Ottoman Turks and ceased to exist. Its bishops were suffragans of the Archbishop of Antivari.

In 1650 it gained territory from the suppressed Diocese of Drivasto. Other ancient sees in this territory were the Diocese of Dinnastrum and Diocese of Balazum.

On 14 March 1867, it was promoted as Archdiocese of Shkodrë (Scutari) (Note: Latin: Archidioecesis Scodrensis) when Scutari was aeque principaliter united with the Archdiocese of Antivari, and in this way Pope Pius IX made Scutari an archdiocese. The first archbishop of the united diocese, Karl Pooten, native of Teveren near Geilenkirchen, Germany, who had been Apostolic Administrator of Antivari (1834–1855), died at Scutari on 15 January 1886.

On 23 October 1886, the Archdiocese of Scutari was again separated from that of Antivari, and remained an archdiocese with three suffragan dioceses: the Alessio, Sappa and Pulati.

Pope John Paul II visited the archdicoese in April 1993. Several years later, on 25 January 2005, John Paul II suppressed the Diocese of Pult, and renamed Shkodrë to the Archdiocese of Shkodrë–Pult, (Note: Latin: Archidioecesis Scodrensis–Pulatensis) incorporating territory from the former diocese.

== Ordinaries ==
Below is an incomplete list of the ordinaries of the Archdiocese of Shkodër-Pult, all of whom are Latin Rite.

Suffragan Bishops of Scutari (Shkodrë)

- Bassus (c. 392)
- Senecio (I, II?) (c. 392; 424; 431; 446)
- Andrew (519)
- Phocas (553)
- Stephen (591)
- John (Iohannes Scoritanus) (597; 599)
- Constantine (602)

- George I (1141)
- Peter I (Peter of Svač) (1199)
- Anonymous (1251)
- Stephen (Shtjefën Marini/Marin Žaretić?) = Stefano (? – 1303.11.18)
- Miroslav (1307?–?)
- Teodorico (1322–?)
- Peter II (ca. 1325) ?= Pietro (1331?–?)
- Marcus = Marco I (1346.08.20 – ?)
- Martinus = Martino I (? – death 1367?)
- Antin de Seluciis = da Saluzzo, Dominican Order (O.P.) (1367.04.23 – ?)
- Francis = Francesco I (1388.05.04 – ?)
- Henry = Enrico, Friars Minor (O.F.M.) (1390?–?)
- Andruin = Andruino (1398?96 – ?)
- Christopher = Cristoforo, Augustinian Order (O.E.S.A.) (1401.06.10 – 1401.12.14), next Bishop of Polignano (1401.12.14 – ?)
- Migliorino Manfredi (Latin: Migliarinus (Meliorinus)), O.F.M. (1401.12.14 – 1402?)
- Bartolomeo Vanni, O.E.S.A. (1402 – 1403.08.24), previously Bishop of Kotor (Montenegro) (1388 – 1395.02.05), Bishop of Calvi (Italy) (1395.02.05 – 1402); later Bishop of Bovino (Italy) (1403.08.24 – ?)
- Progon (Latin: Proganus Pintzenago) = Progano Printzenago (1403.08.14 – 1405?)
- John = Giovanni I (1407.03.19 – death 1440?)
- Emmanuel (Emanueli de Kandja) = Emanuele, O.P. (1451.01.09 – death 1459?)
- Thaddeus (Tade Paskalika) = Taddeo Pascaligo (1465.03.06 – ?)
- Bartholomew (Italian: Bartolomeo Barbarigo) (1467.02.09 – 1471.10.11), also Apostolic Administrator of Sapë (Albania) (1468 – 1471.10.11); later Bishop of Poreč (Croatia) (1471.10.11 – 1475)
- Francis II (Francesco de Sanctis), O.F.M. (1471.10.14 – 1491?)
- Nicholas (Nicola Lupus) = Nicolò Lupi (1492.03.14 – ?)
- Nicholas II (Albanian: Nikollë Gravina) (1495)
- Jacob (Italian: Giacomo de Humano), O.E.S.A. (1511.03.10 – death 1517.08.10)
- Peter II (Pietro de Gardona) = Pedro Cardona, Augustinian Canons Regular (C.R.S.A.) 1518.02.26 – death 1522)
- Jerome (Geronimo de Carpo) = Girolamo Vascheri, O.F.M. (1522.10.03 – 1524.09.19), next Bishop of Guardialfiera (1524.09.19 – 1533)
- Anthony I (Anton Baccaria) = Antonio Beccari, O.P. (1534.09.23 – death 1543)
- Melchiorre Pelletta (1570)
- Theodore (Theodor Kalompsi) = Teodoro Calompsi (1575.10.26 – death 1578?)
- Paul(us) I = Paolo da Zara, O.P. (1582.03.05 – death 1585)
- Duka (Duka Armani) (1590.06.13 – ?)
- Andrew I = Andrea (? – death 1622?)
- Dominic I (Latin: Dominicus Andriasius, Serbo-Croatian: Dominik Andrijašević) = Domenico Andreassi, O.F.M. (?1622.03.23 – death 1637)
- ? Benedict (Benedikt Ursini) (1626–????)
- Francis III (Françesku Kruta) = Francesco Cruta (1640.09.10 – death 1645?)
- Gregory (Gregorio Frassina de Novara) = Gregorio Frasini, O.F.M. (1646.09.10 – death 1656?)
- Peter III (Pjetër Bogdani) = Pietro Bogdano (1656.03.06 – 1677.11.08), also Apostolic Administrator of Archdiocese of Bar (Montenegro) (1659.10.24 – 1671.02.23); next Metropolitan Archbishop of Skopje (Macedonia) (1677.11.08 – death 1689.11)
- Dominic II (Serbo-Croatian: Dominik Babić/Bobić) = Domenico Bubić (1677.11.22 – death 1686)
- Andrew II (Andrea Gallata) (1686.09.16 – death 1690?)
  - Apostolic administrator Marinus II (Marin Grago) = Marino Drago (1690.02.11 – 1693.12.22), while Bishop of Kotor (Montenegro) (1688.05.31 – 1708.10.03); later Bishop of Budua (1696.07.07 – ?), Bishop of Korcula (1708.10.03 – death 1733.10.09)
- Anthony II (Anton/Ndoc Vlladanji) (13 August 1691 – 1693)
- Anthony III (Anton Nigri/Negri / Antonius de Nigris) = Antonio Negri (1693.12.22 – death 1702)
  - Apostolic Administrator Father Peter Karagić, O.F.M. (1698.08.20 – 1698.09.15), no previous prelature; later Bishop of Pult (Albania) (1698.09.15 – 1702.09.25), Metropolitan Archbishop of Skopje (Macedonia) (1702.09.25 – ?)
- Antonio IV Babbi (1703.01.15 – death 1728.10)
- Anthony V (Anton/Ndoc Vlladanji) = Antonio Vladagni (1729.12.23 – death 1740)
- Paul II (Paolo Campsinato di Pietro / Pal Kampsi) = Paolo Campsi (25 May 1742 – death 1771), also Bishop of Lezhë (Albania) (1748.09.16 – 1750)
- George II (Gjergj Radovani) = Giorgio Angelo Radovani (29 July 1771 – 23 April 1787), previously Apostolic Vicar of Sofia–Plovdiv (Bulgaria) (1767.04.30 – 1771.07.29); later Metropolitan Archbishop of Bar (Montenegro) (1787.04.23 – death 1790.11.15) and Bishop of Budua (1787.04.27 – 1790.11.15)
- Francis IV (Francesco Borzi) (23 April 1787 – 11 April 1791), next Metropolitan Archbishop of Bar (Montenegro) (1791.04.11 – 1823.02.11) and Bishop of Budua (1791.09.27 – 1823.02.11)
- Matthew (Matteo Crescesi) (11 April 1791 – death 1808.01.24)
- Antonio Angelo Radovani (1808.07.08 – death 1814.05.03), previously Bishop of Sapë (Albania) (1796.06.27 – 1808.07.08
- Antonio Dodmassei (1814.12.19 – death 1816.07.21), previously Bishop of Pult (Albania) (1808.07.08 – 1814.12.19)
- Nikolla Muriqi (1817.07.04 – death 1824.02.14)
- Ambrogio Bruci (1824.08.24 – death 1831.06.21)
- Benigno Albertini, Franciscans (O.F.M. Obs.) (13 April 1832 – death 1838.08.24)
- Louis I (Luigi Guglielmi) (24 September 1839 – 1852.09.27), next Bishop of Verona (Italy) (1852.09.27 – death 1853.01.29)
  - Apostolic Administrator Giovanni Topić (Gjon Topiq), O.F.M. Obs. (1842.01.12 – 1845 see below), while Bishop of Lezhë (Albania) (1842.01.12 – 1853.09.27)
- Giovanni Topić = John II (Gjon Topiq), O.F.M. Obs. (27 September 1853 – retired 1859.01.17), emeritate 'promoted' as Titular Archbishop of Philippopolis (1859.07.10 – death 1868.06.11)
- Louis II (Luigi Ciurcia) (6 February 1859 – 27 July 1866), next Titular Archbishop of Irenopolis (1866.07.27 – death 1881.07.13) as Apostolic Vicar of Egypt (Egypt) (1866.07.27 – 1881.05.01) and Apostolic Delegate (papal diplomatic envoy) to [British protectorates] Egypt and Arabia (1866.07.27 – 1881.07.13); previously Bishop of Lezhë (Albania) (1853.09.27 – 1858.06.04), Titular Bishop of Delcus (1858.06.04 – 1859.02.06) as Coadjutor Bishop of Shkodrë (1858.06.04 – succession 1859.02.06)

Non-Metropolitan Archbishop of Shkodrë (Scutari)

- Charles (Karl Pooten) (15 March 1867 – death 15 January 1886), previously Titular Bishop of Maronia (1844.02 – 1855.08.31), Metropolitan Archbishop of Bar (Montenegro) (1855.08.31 – 1886.01.15)

Metropolitan Archbishops of Shkodrë (Scutari)

- Pascal (Pasquale Guerini) (born Italy) (23 November 1886 – retired November 1910), emeritate as Titular Archbishop of Melitene (1910.01.14 – death 1911.02.08); previously Titular Bishop of Paphos (1879.05.06 – 1886.11.23) as Auxiliary Bishop of Archdiocese of Bar (Montenegro) (1879.05.06 – 1886.11.23)
  - Auxiliary Bishop: Andrea Logorezzi (born Albania) (1887.01.07 – 1888.06.15), Titular Bishop of Iuliopolis (1887.01.07 – 1888.06.15); later Metropolitan Archbishop of Skopje (Macedonia) (1888.06.15 – death 1891.12.29)
  - Coadjutor Archbishop: Lazaro Miedia = Lazarus (Lazër Mjeda) (1904.12.24 – 1909.04.14 see below), Titular Archbishop of Areopolis (1904.12.24 – 1909.04.14); previously Bishop of Sapë (Albania) (1900.11.10 – 1904.12.24); next Metropolitan Archbishop of Skopje (Macedonia) (1909.04.14 – 1921.10.19)
- Giacomo Sereggi = Jacob (Jak(ë) Serreqi) (14 April 1910 – 14 October 1921), previously Bishop of Sapë (Albania) (1905.08.07 – 1910.04.14); emeritate as Titular Archbishop of Cyzicus (1921.10.14 – death 1922.04.11)
- Lazaro Miedia = Lazarus (Lazër Mjeda) (see above 19 October 1921 – death 8 July 1935)
- Gaspar(e) (Gaspër Thaçi) (27 January 1936 – death 25 May 1946)
  - Apostolic Administrator Ernesto Çoba (1952.01.21 – death 1979.04.15), Titular Bishop of Midaëum (1952.01.21 – 1979.04.15)
- Francis (Frano Illia) (25 December 1992 – death 22 October 1997), also President of Episcopal Conference of Albania (1993 – 22 October 1997)
  - Auxiliary Bishop: Zef Simoni (born Albania) (25 December 1992 – retired 20 January 2004), Titular Bishop of Bararus (1992.12.25 – death 2009.02.21)

Metropolitan Archbishops of Shkodrë-Pult (Scutari-Pulati)

- Angel (Angelo Massafra) (born Italy) (28 March 1998 – 8 January 2025), President of Episcopal Conference of Albania (2000–2006 and 2012.09 – ...), previously Bishop of Rrëshen (Albania) (1996.12.07 – 1998.03.28).
- Giovanni Peragine, B. (As coadjutor 20 May 2024, as archbishop 8 January 2025 – present)

== See also ==
- List of Catholic dioceses in Albania

== Sources and external links ==
- Живковић, Војислав. Скадарска епископија до 1089. године. Византијско-словенска чтенија VII (2024), 253-262. (The Bishopric of Shkodra until 1089.)
- GCatholic, with Google map & satellite photo - data for all sections
- Hierarchia catholica medii aevi. Typis et sumptibus Domus Editorialis "Il Messaggero di S. Antonio". 1913.
- Acta et diplomata res Albaniae mediae aetatis illustrantia: Annos 1344-1406 continens. Typis Adolphi Holzhausen. 1918.
- Catholic Hierarchy page
