= Ad Turres (Byzacena) =

Roman and Vandal era colonia in North Africa

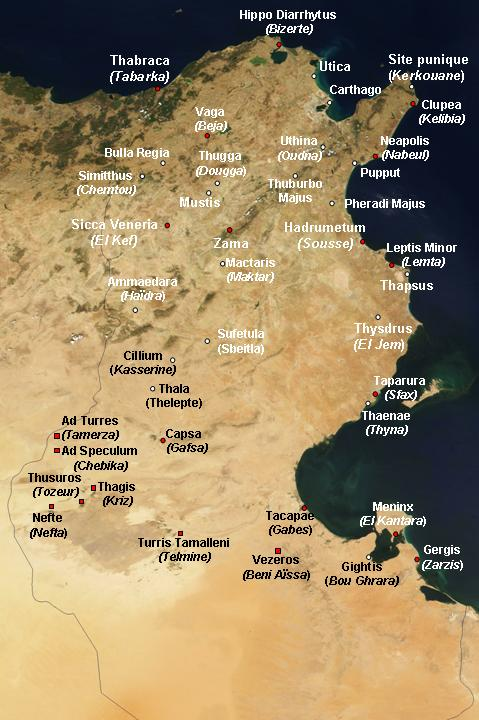
Map showing Turres

Turres in Byzacena was a Roman and Vandal era colonia (city) in North Africa.

The exact location of the town is unknown but is probably the ruins at Tamarza or nearby ruins of Msilica. Tamarza is located close to the Algerian border, 70 km from Tozeur and is surrounded by steep and arid wild country. The site is renowned for its clear water cascades and springs that irrigate the town's park.

== Bishopric ==
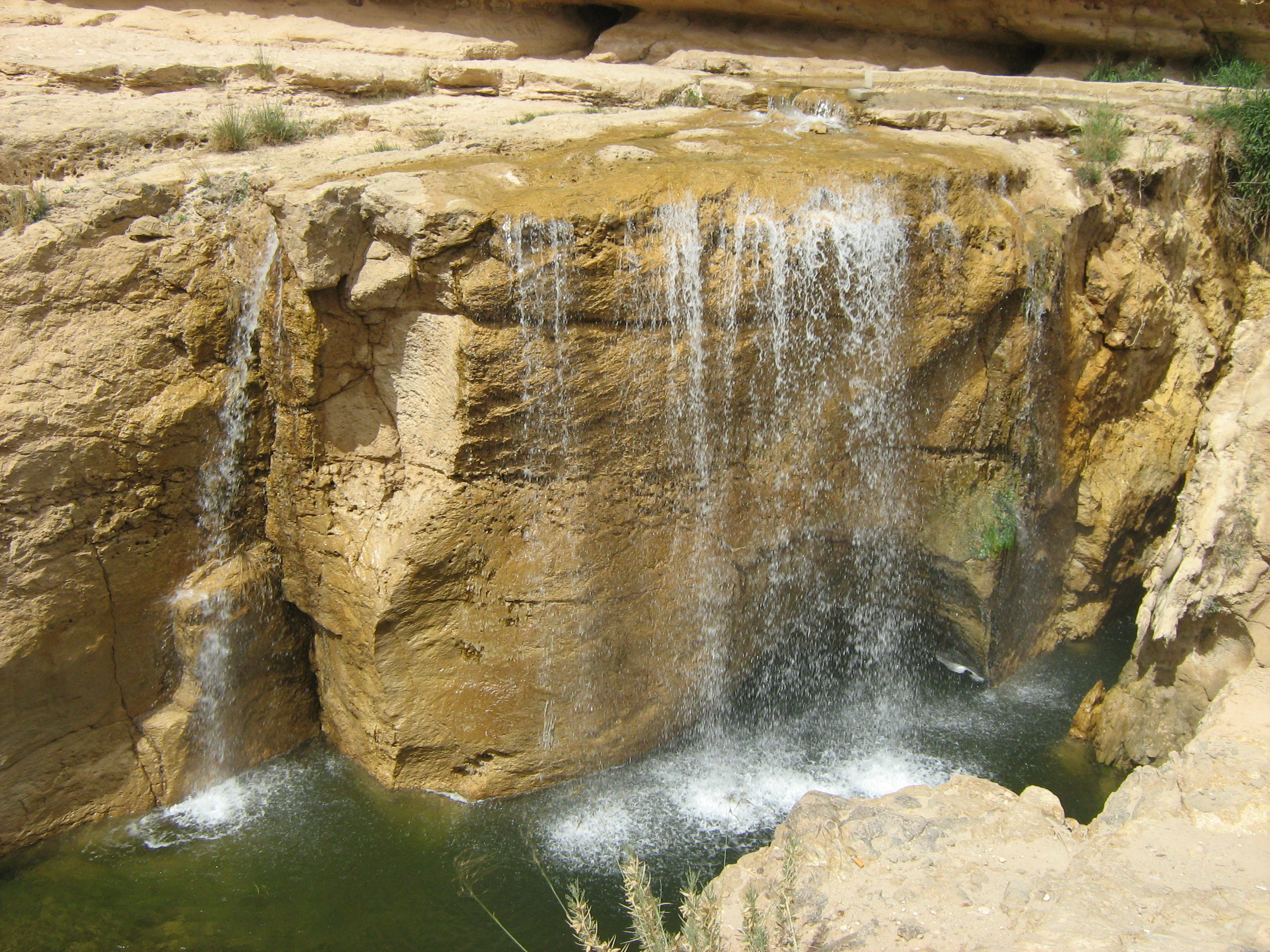
Tamarza

Turres in Byzacena was the site of an early bishopric in Roman times. The diocese ceased to function with the arrival of Islam in the 680sAD, but remains a titular see of the Roman Catholic Church in the province of Byzacena.

Bishops

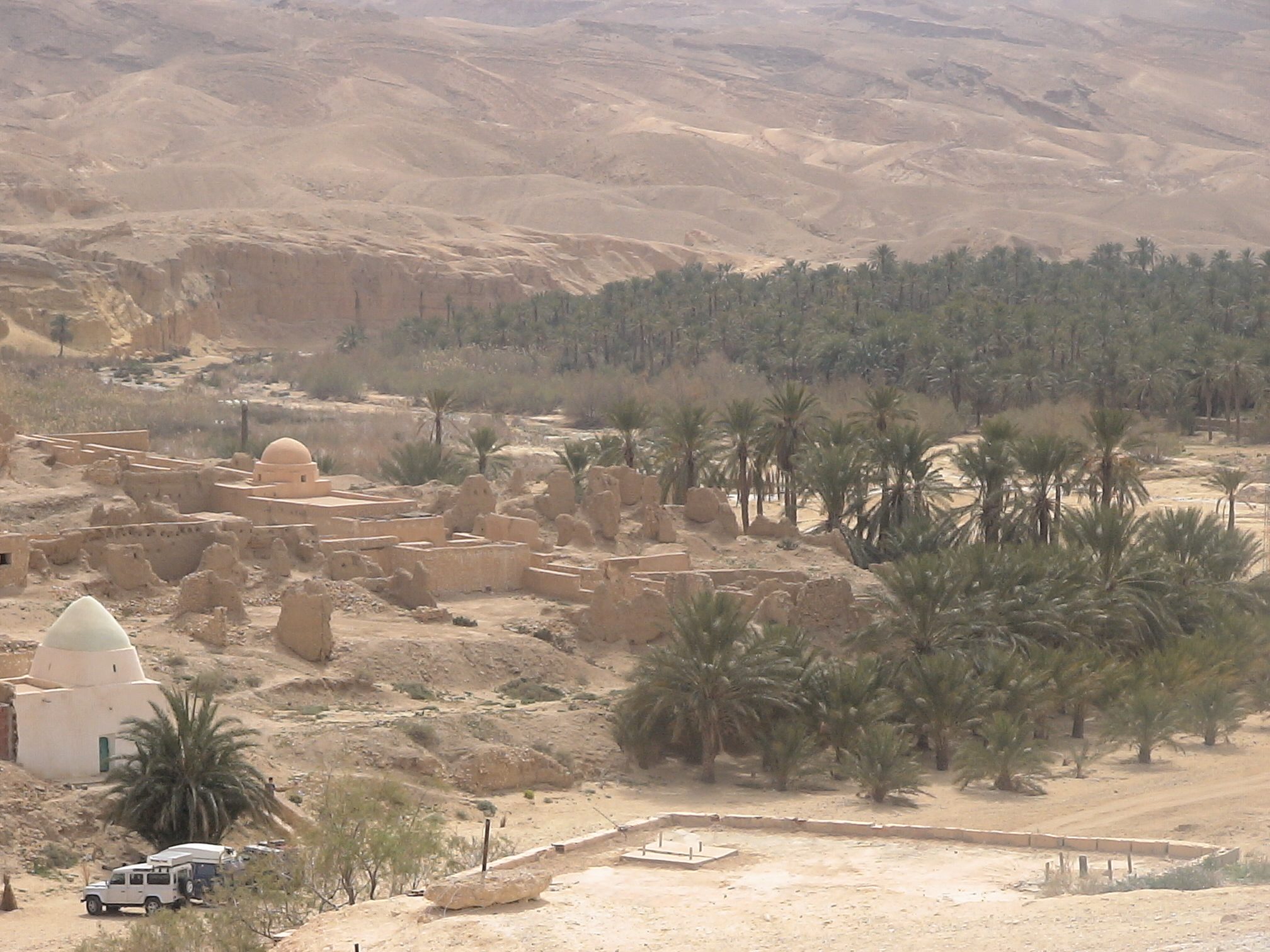
Oasis de Tamerza

1. Juan Carlos Aramburu Bishop of Buenos Aires (Argentina) June 14, 1967 – April 22, 1975
2. Bonifácio Piccinini Bishop of Cuiabá (Brazil) June 27, 1975 – August 15, 1981
3. Manuel Salazar y Espinoza Emeritus Bishop of Leon de Nicaragua (Nicaragua) December 19, 1981 – August 16, 1995
4. Hil Kabashi Apostolic administrator of southern Albania December 3, 1996
