= Angelo Massafra =

Italian-born Albanian Roman Catholic archbishop (born 1949)

Monsignor Angelo Massafra OFM
- Archbishop of Shkodër–Pult
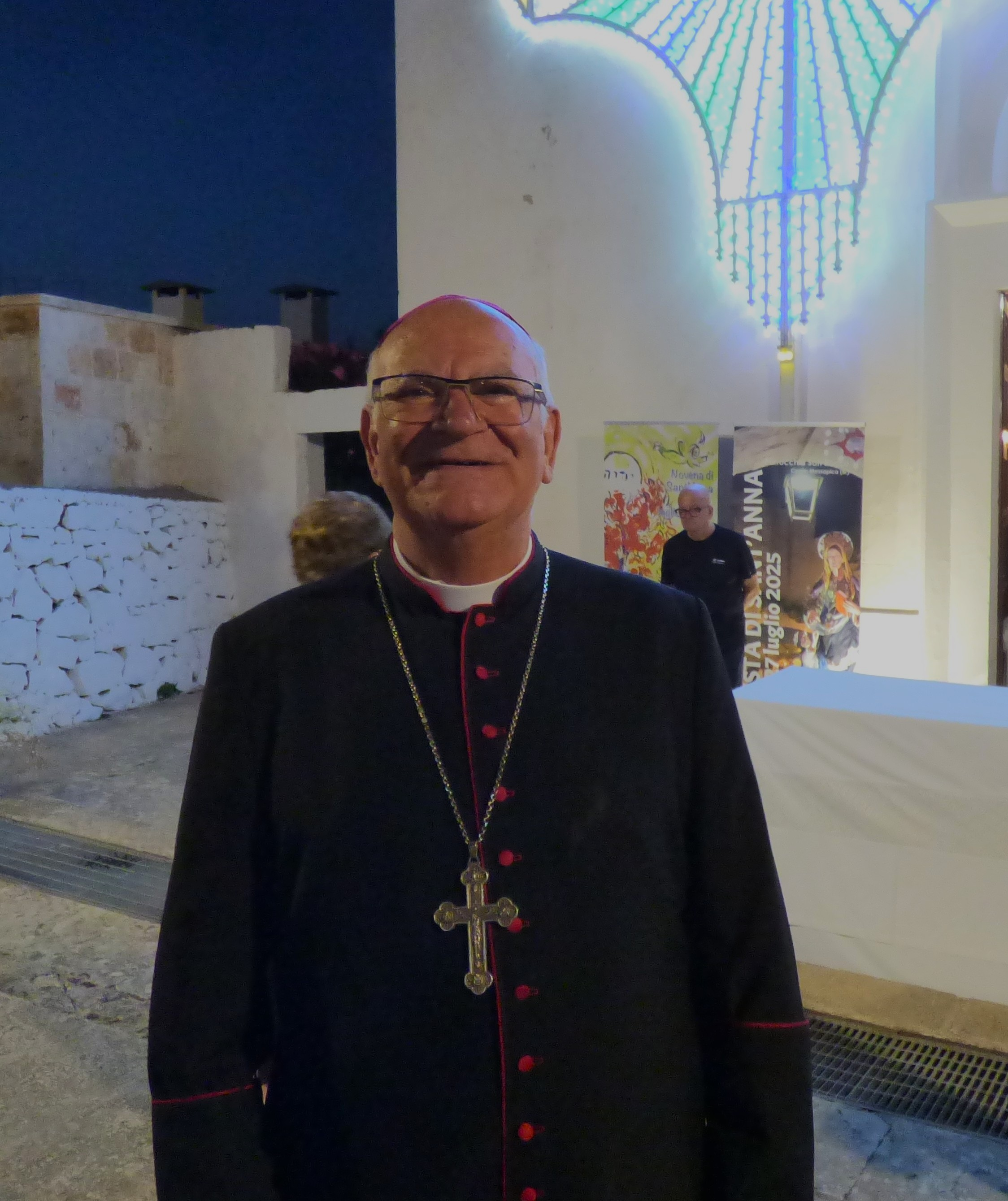
- Coat of arms
- Church: Latin Church
- Archdiocese: Roman Catholic Archdiocese of Shkodër–Pult
- Province: Roman Catholic Archdiocese of Shkodër–Pult
- Metropolis: Roman Catholic Archdiocese of Shkodër–Pult
- Diocese: Roman Catholic Diocese of Rrëshen
- Installed: 2006
- Term ended: 8 January 2025
- Successor: Giovanni Peragine

Orders
- Consecration: by Rrok Mirdita

Personal details
- Born: 23 March 1949 (age 77) San Marzano di San Giuseppe, Apulia, Italy

- Coat of arms

Angelo Massafra (23 March 1949) is an Italian-born Albanese Catholic archbishop of Arbëreshë ancestry, metropolitan archbishop of the Roman Catholic Archdiocese of Shkodër–Pult since 25 January 2005. Monsignor Massafra from 2025 resign as Archbishop of Roman Catholic Archdiocese of Shkodër-Pult Giovanni Peragine.

== Life ==
He was born on 23 March 1949 in San Marzano di San Giuseppe, a historic Arbëreshë community with Albanian ancestry in Apulia.

He was ordained a priest of the Order of Friars Minor on 21 September 1974 by the Archbishop of Lecce Francesco Minerva.

On 7 December 1996, Pope John Paul II nominated him bishop of Rrëshen and consecrated him bishop on 6 January in the St. Peter's Basilica. On 28 March 1998 he was appointed archbishop of Shkodër and on 25 January 2005, following the reorganization of the ecclesiastical circumscriptions of Albania, he became archbishop of the Roman Catholic Archdiocese of Shkodër–Pult, born from the union of the archdiocese of Shkodër and the diocese of Pult.

He made ad limina apostolorum at the Holy See in 2008 and 2017.

From 2014 to 2016, he was the vice-president of the Council of the Bishops' Conferences of Europe (CCEE) and in 2017 he became the President of Caritas Albania. In February 2018, he also became a member of the Justice and Peace Commission of the CCEE.

== See also ==
- List of Catholic dioceses in Albania
