= Apostolic Administration of Southern Albania =

Catholic ecclesiastical territory in Albania

Apostolic Administration of Southern Albania Administratio Apostolica Albaniae Meridionalis Administratura Apostolike e Shqiperisë së Jugut

Catholic

Location
- Country: Albania
- Territory: Southern Albania
- Ecclesiastical province: Tiranë–Durrës

Statistics
- Area: 16,172 km^{2} (6,244 sq mi)
- Population: Total; Catholics: (as of 2022); ▼1,421,036; ▼1,921 ( 0.1%)
- Parishes: ▼5

Information
- Denomination: Catholic Church
- Sui iuris church: Latin Church and Albanian Greek Catholic Church
- Rite: Roman Rite and Byzantine Rite
- Established: 11 November 1939 (86 years ago)
- Cathedral: Pro-Cathedral of St. Mary and St. Louis in Vlorë
- Secular priests: ▲3 diocesan (2022); ▲11 religious priests

Current leadership
- Pope: Leo XIV
- Apostolic Administrator: Flavio Cavallini, O.F.M.
- Metropolitan Archbishop: George Anthony Frendo
- Bishops emeritus: Hil Kabashi, O.F.M.

Map
- Apostolic Administration of Southern Albania

The Apostolic Administration of Southern Albania (Albanian: Administratura Apostolike e Shqiperisë së Jugut, Latin: Administratio Apostolica Albaniae Meridionalis, Italian: Albania Meridionale) is an apostolic administration of the Catholic Church in Albania, covering the southern regions of the country. It has jurisdiction over all Catholics on its territory, both of Latin Church and Byzantine Catholics. It is suffragan to the Archdiocese of Tiranë–Durrës. Its cathedra is in the Pro-Cathedral of St. Mary and St. Louis (Albanian: Kisha e Shën Maria dhe Shën Luigji) in the episcopal see of Vlorë.

The Apostolic Administration of Southern Albania constitutes an ecclesiastical territory comprising the Albanian Greek Catholic Church, which itself does not exclusively govern any episcopal jurisdictions. Such claims have been questioned by some leading Eastern Catholic experts.

== History ==
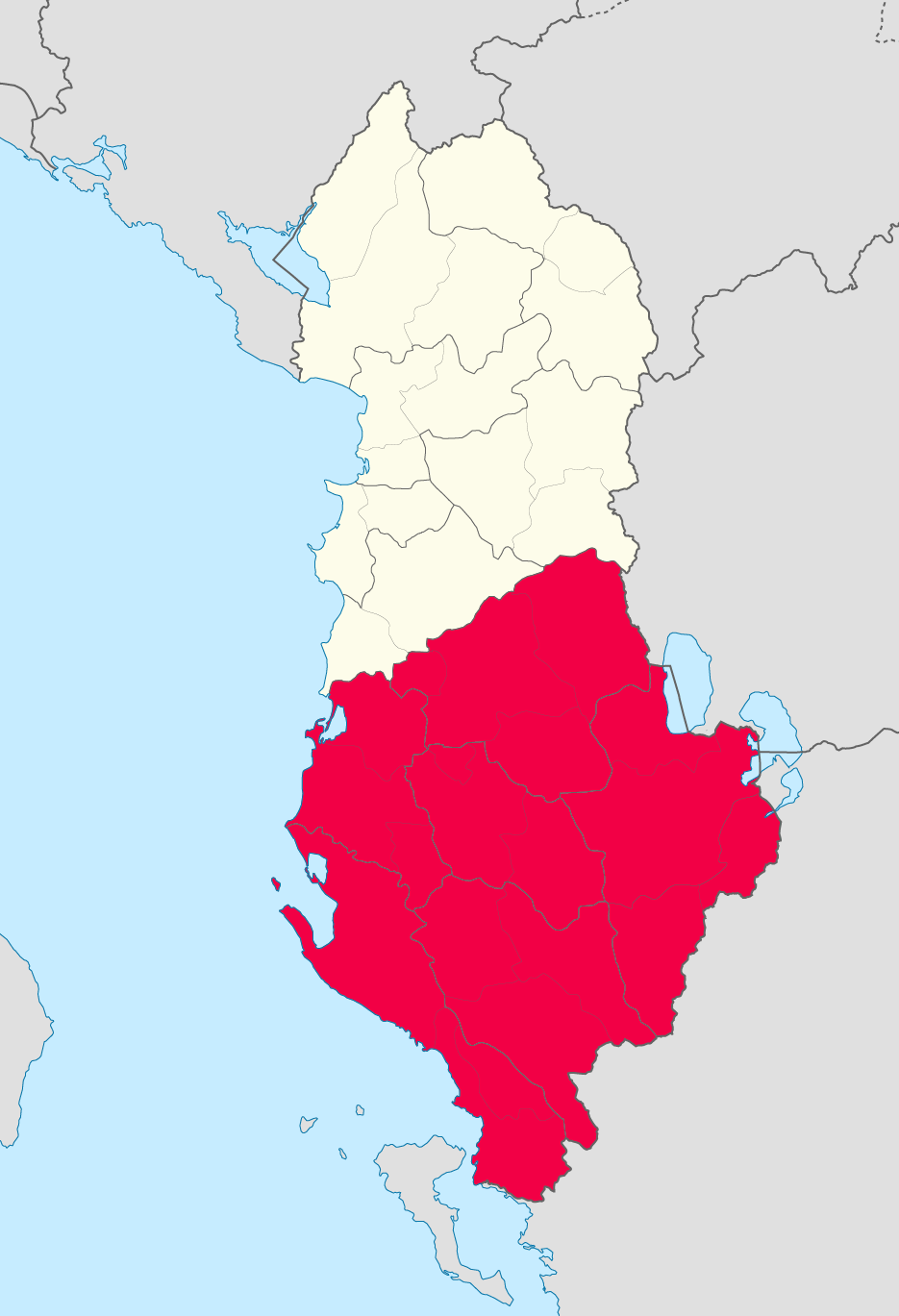
Territory of the Apostolic Administration of Southern Albania

On 11 November 1939, the Holy See issued the papal bull Inter regiones, establishing the Apostolic Administration of Southern Albania. Initially, it was created as a regular apostolic administration, for all Catholics in southern regions of Albania, both of Latin and Byzantine rites. Its territory was detached from the Latin Catholic Archdiocese of Durrës, and initially covered districts of Elbasan, Korçë, Berat, Vlorë and Gjirokastër.

Since 25 January 2005, it is suffragan to the Latin Catholic Archdiocese of Tiranë–Durrës, within the newly created metropolitan province.

From 1937 to 2024, the Apostolic Administration was served exclusively by priests supplied from the Diocese of Rimini, until the first local priest was ordained in 2024.

== Apostolic Administrators ==
- Leone Giovanni Battista Nigris, Titular Archbishop of Philippi (11 November 1939 – 1945), while Apostolic Delegate to Albania
- Nikollë Vinçenc Prennushi (O.F.M.) (1946 – death 19 March 1949), while Archbishop of Durrës
- position vacant (1949 – 1992)
- Ivan Dias, Titular Archbishop of Rusibisir (1992 – 1996.11.08), while Apostolic Nuncio (papal ambassador) to Albania, previously Apostolic Pro-Nuncio to Benin (1982.05.08 – 1987.06.20), Ghana and Togo (1982.05.08 – 1987.06.20), Apostolic Nuncio to Korea (1987.06.20 – 1991.01.16); later Metropolitan Archbishop of Bombay (India) (1996.11.08 – 2006.05.20), created Cardinal-priest of Spirito Santo alla Ferratella (2001.02.21 [2001.06.03] – ...), Prefect of the Roman Congregation for the Evangelization of Peoples (2006.05.20 – 2011.05.10), President of the Interdicasterial Commission for Consecrated Religious (2006.05.20 – 2011.05.10), Grand Chancellor of the Pontifical Urbaniana University (2006.05.20 – 2011.05.10)
- Hil Kabashi, O.F.M., Titular Bishop of Turres in Byzacena (3 December 1996 – 15 June 2017)
- Giovanni Peragine, B., Titular Bishop of Phoenice (15 June 2017 – 20 May 2024)
- Flavio Cavallini, O.F.M. (since 25 April 2026)

== See also ==
- Catholic Church in Albania

== Sources ==
- Galadza, Peter (2007). "Eastern Catholic Christianity". The Blackwell Companion to Eastern Christianity. Malden, MA: Blackwell Publishing. pp. 291–318. ISBN 9780470766392.
