= Midaeium =

Ancient Phrygian town

Coordinates: 39°47′59″N 30°50′44″E

Midaeium or Midaëum or Midaeion (Ancient Greek: Μιδάειον), or Midaium or Midaion (Μιδάιον), was a town in the northeast of ancient Phrygia. It was situated on the little river Bathys, on the road from Dorylaeum to Pessinus, and in Roman times belonged to the conventus of Synnada. In the Synecdemus it appears as Medaium or Medaion (Μεδάϊον). The town, as its name indicates, must have been built by one of the ancient kings of Phrygia, and has become celebrated in history from the fact that Sextus Pompeius, the son of Pompey the Great, was there taken prisoner by the generals of Marcus Antonius, and afterwards put to death. It has been supposed, with some probability, that the town of Mygdum, mentioned by Ammianus Marcellinus, is the same as Midaeium.

It was the see of a bishop in antiquity; no longer a residential bishopric, under the name Midaëum it remains a titular see of the Roman Catholic Church.

Its site is located near Karahüyük, Eskişehir, Asiatic Turkey.
