= Albanian Greek Catholic Church =

Eastern Catholic church

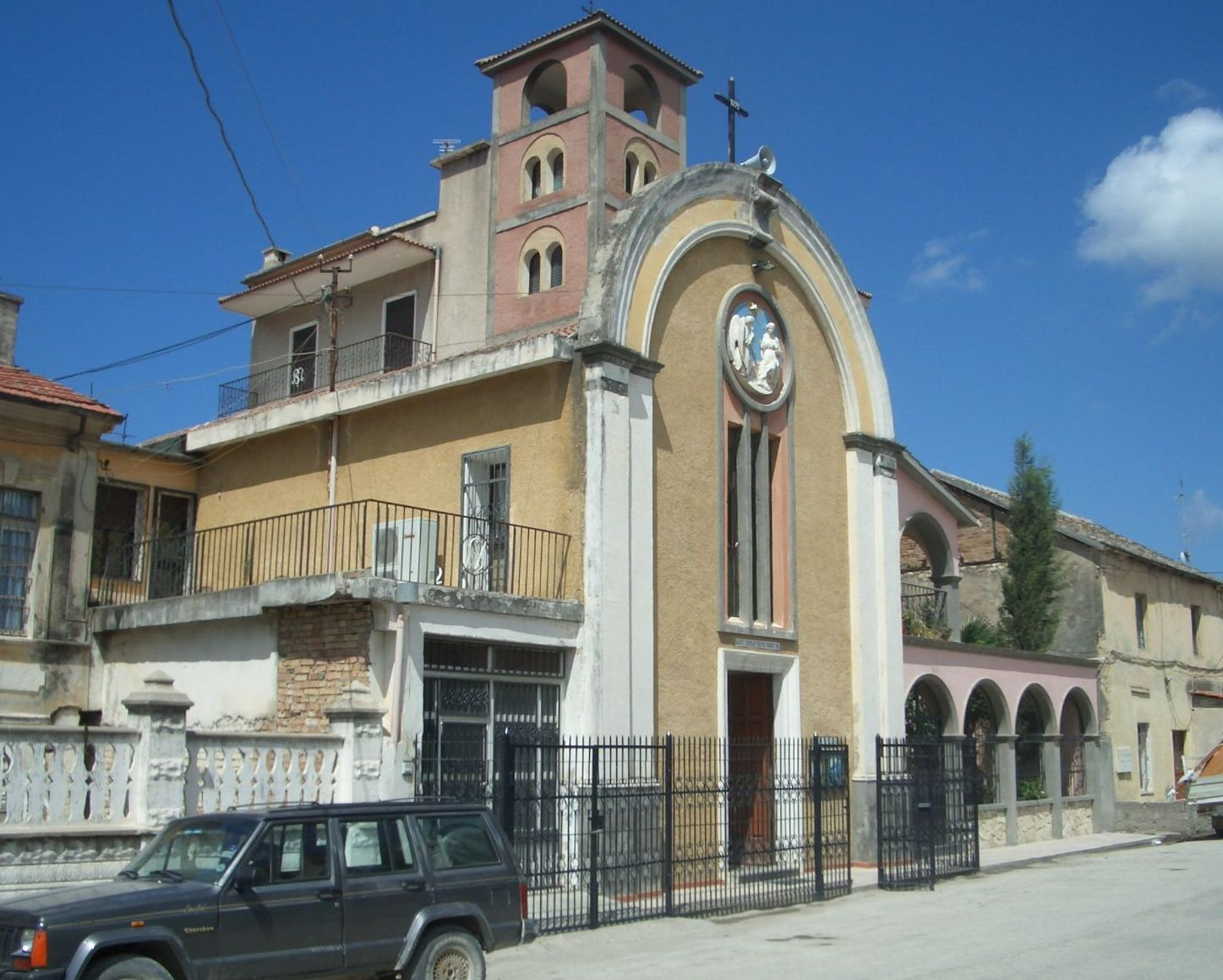
- Cathedral of St. Mary and St. Louis in Vlorë
- Type: Particular church (sui iuris)
- Classification: Christian
- Orientation: Eastern Catholic
- Polity: Episcopal
- Governance: Apostolic administration
- Pope: Leo XIV
- Apostolic Administrator: Flavio Cavallini
- Associations: Congregation for the Oriental Churches
- Region: Southern Albania
- Liturgy: Byzantine Rite
- Headquarters: Elbasan
- Origin: 1638; Ottoman Empire (modern Albania)
- Congregations: 9
- Members: 3,845
- Ministers: 12
- Other name: Apostolic Administration of Southern Albania

The Albanian Greek Catholic Church, (Note: Albanian: Kisha Katolike Bizantine Shqiptare) or the Albanian Byzantine Catholic Church, is an autonomous (sui iuris in Latin) Byzantine Rite particular church in full communion with the Catholic Church and the Pope, whose members live in Albania under the pastoral governance of the Apostolic Administration of Southern Albania. The Albanian Greek Catholic Church, with its Byzantine Rite, is closely linked to the Italo-Albanian Catholic Church, the two sharing much of their history, identity and tradition in common.

== History ==
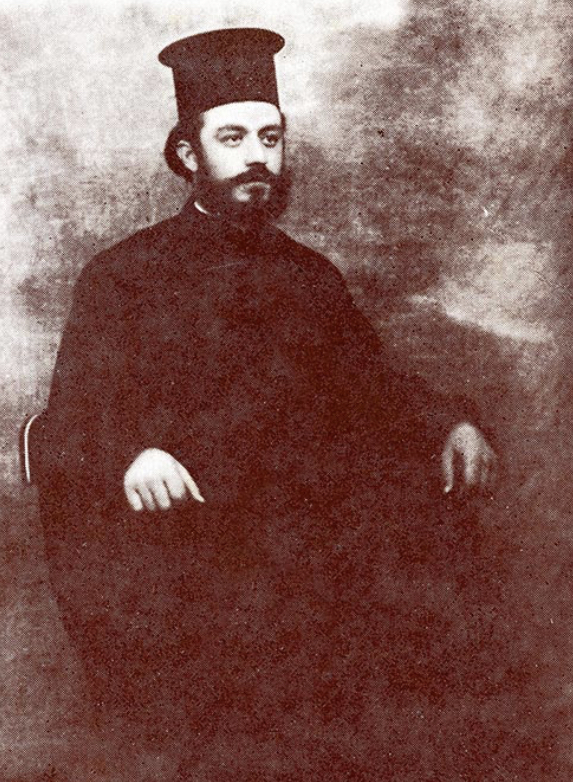
Blessed Josif Papamihali (1912 – 1948)

The conversion to Christianity of Albania took place under the influence of Latin Christianity and its Roman Rite liturgy in the north, and Byzantine Christianity in the south. Christianity was the first and the oldest monotheistic religion of Albanian people. Although the Greek liturgical rite was used in many of its churches, Albania was part of the patriarchate of Rome until 731, when Byzantine Emperor Leo III, in reprisal for the opposition of Pope Gregory III to the emperor's iconoclast policy, attached the whole of Eastern Illyricum to the patriarchate of Constantinople.

After the fifteenth-century Ottoman conquest, some two thirds of the population accepted Islam, but Catholics of the Latin Church remained in the north of the country. A Catholic mission worked in the south from 1660, when the Orthodox archbishop joined the Catholic Church, to 1765, when the effort was abandoned because of obstacles placed by the Ottoman rulers. In 1895 a group of villages in Mali Shpati, southeast of Elbasan in central Albania, decided to become Catholic and demanded a bishop of their own rite, a proposal to which the consular representatives of Russia and Montenegro raised objections with the civil authorities. At about the same time, another group of Greek Catholics arose, centred on an archimandrite, George Germanos, who was a nephew of the Orthodox metropolitan in 1900, and concluded a definitive movement of Catholic unity formed in Elbasan. Numbers grew only to a small extent, but enough for southern Albania to become in 1939 a separate ecclesiastical jurisdiction in the care of an Apostolic Administrator. However, after less than seven years, the administrator was expelled, and contact seemed lost with the Byzantine faithful, who found themselves under strict Communist rule. In 1967, Communist-ruled Albania was officially declared an atheist state.

Only in 1992 was it possible to appoint a new apostolic administrator. At first the post was given to the Holy See's diplomatic representative in Tirana, Archbishop Ivan Dias, who later became Archbishop of Mumbai and a cardinal. Archbishop Dias's successor as Apostolic Administrator of Southern Albania, not as Nuncio, is the Croatian-born Byzantine-Rite Franciscan bishop Hil Kabashi, who was appointed in 1996.

By 1998 there were no parishes or priests for the few Byzantine Catholic faithful. Later a small Byzantine parish was established in Elbasan, the same place where Friar Jorgji Germanos settled in 1900. Josif Papamihali was beatified in Shkodër on 5 November 2016.

== The church today ==
The apostolic administratorship of Southern Albania has 3,200 Catholics in nine parishes, with 11 churches, and is served by four diocesan priests and 10 religious priests, 10 male and 97 female religious, who administer 10 schools and 20 charitable institutions. The great majority of these are of the Latin Church.

== See also ==
- Catholic Church in Albania
- Albanian Orthodox Church
- Eastern Catholic Churches
- Italo-Albanian Catholic Church

== Sources ==
- Oriente Cattolico (Vatican City: The Sacred Congregation for the Eastern Churches, 1974)
- Annuario Pontificio.
