= Catholic Church in Albania =

- Albanian: Kisha Katolike në Shqipëri
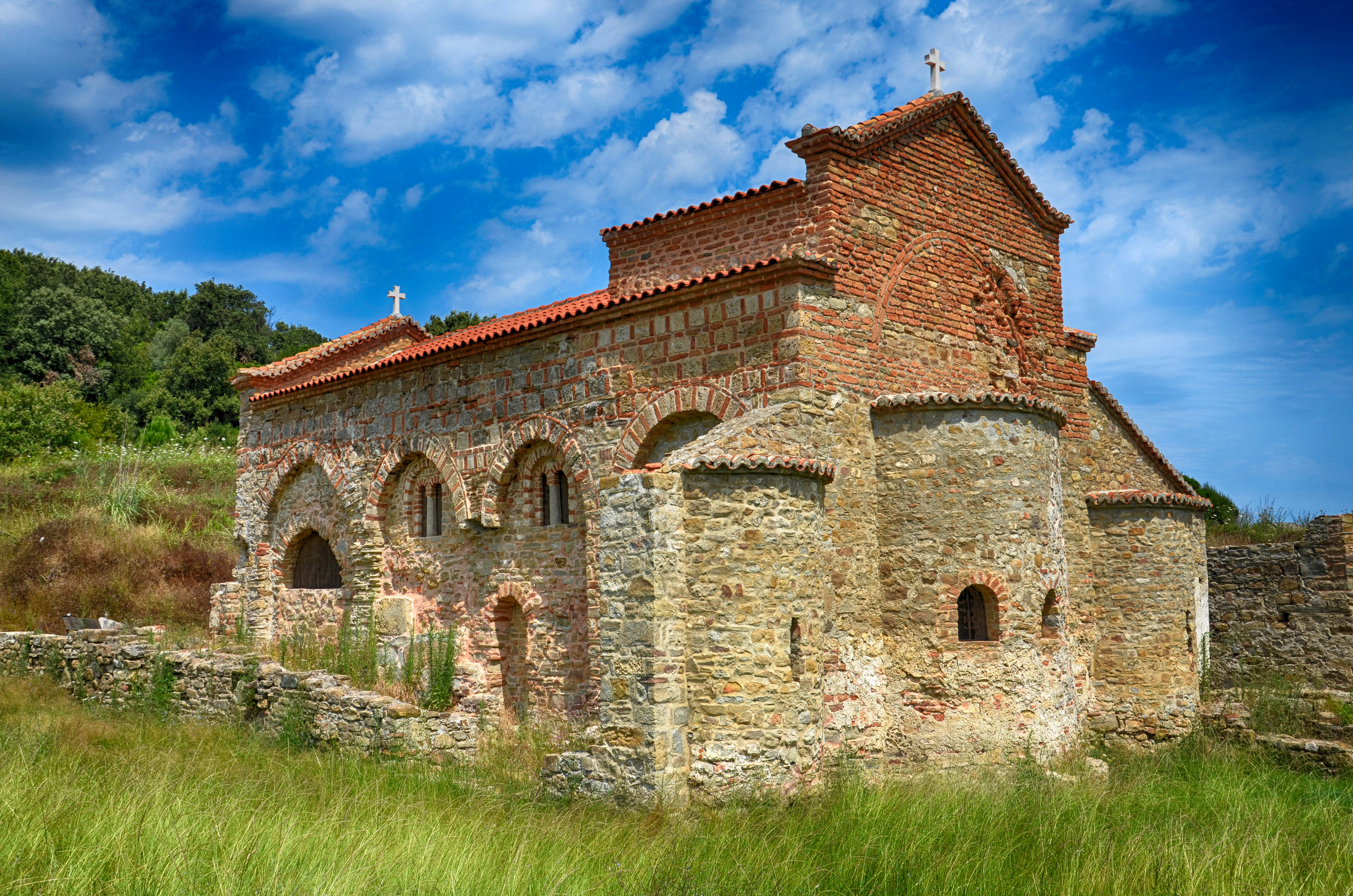
- Medieval catholic Saint Anthony's church at Cape of Rodon, Albania
- Type: National polity
- Classification: Catholic
- Orientation: Latin
- Scripture: Bible
- Theology: Catholic theology
- Polity: Episcopal
- Governance: Albanian Bishops' Conference
- Pope: Leo XIV
- President: Gjergj Meta
- Region: Albania
- Language: Albanian and Latin
- Headquarters: Tirana
- Members: 201,530 (8.38%) (2023 census)

The Catholic Church in Albania (Albanian: Kisha Katolike në Shqipëri) is part of the worldwide Catholic Church, under the spiritual leadership of the Pope in Rome. At the 2023 census, the percentage of Catholics was 8.38%, making Catholicism the largest form of Christianity in Albania.

Catholicism is strongest in the northwestern part of the country, which historically had the most readily available contact with, and support from, Rome and the Republic of Venice. Mirditë has the highest concentration of Catholics, while Shkodër is the center of Catholicism in Albania. More than 20,000 Albanian Catholics are located in Montenegro, mostly in Ulcinj, Bar, Podgorica, Tuzi, Gusinje and Plav. The region is considered part of the Malsia Highlander region of the seven Albanian Catholic tribes. The region was split from the Ottoman Albania after the First Balkan War. There are also scattered Albanian Catholics in Kosovo and North Macedonia, with the greatest concentration being in the vicinity of Gjakova.

There are five dioceses in the country, including two archdioceses plus an Apostolic Administration covering southern Albania. Caritas Albania is the official social arm of the Church.

== History ==
=== Early Church in Albania ===
Christianity in Albania began when Christians arrived in Illyria soon after the time of Jesus, with Saint Caesar of Dyrrhachium being appointed as the bishop of Dyrrhachium (Epidamnus) in 58 AD. Christianity also came to Epirus nova, then part of the Roman province of Macedonia.

Since the 3rd and 4th century AD, Christianity had become the established religion in Byzantium, supplanting pagan polytheism and eclipsing for the most part the humanistic world outlook and institutions inherited from the Greek and Roman civilizations. The Durrës Amphitheatre (Albanian: Amfiteatri i Durrësit) is a historic monument from the time period located in Durrës, Albania, that was used to preach Christianity to civilians during that time. When the Roman Empire was divided into eastern and western halves in AD 395, Illyria east of the Drinus River (Drina between Bosnia and Serbia), including the lands form Albania, were administered by the Eastern Empire but were ecclesiastically dependent on Rome.

Though the country was in the fold of Byzantium, Christians in the region remained under the jurisdiction of the Pope until 732. In that year the iconoclast Byzantine emperor Leo III, angered by archbishops of the region because they had supported Rome in the Iconoclastic Controversy, detached the church of the province from the Roman pope and placed it under the patriarch of Constantinople.

=== Middle Ages ===
The church in Albania during the Middle Ages was evenly split between the Roman Catholic and Eastern Orthodox churches. The Arbanasi (Old south Slavic word for Albanians) are recorded as being 'half-believers' (Roman Catholics) and speaking their own language in a Bulgarian text found in a Serbian manuscript dating to 1628; the text was written by an anonymous author that according to Radoslav Grujić (1934) dated to the reign of Samuel of Bulgaria (997–1014), or possibly, according to R. Elsie, 1000–1018.

==== Catholic Church in Arbanon ====
In 1166, we know that prior Arbanensis Andrea and episcopis Arbanensis Lazarus who were the Bishops of Arbanum participated in a Roman Catholic ceremony held in Kotor.

A year later in 1167, Pope Alexander III, in a letter directed to Lazarus, congratulates him for returning his bishopric to Catholic faith and invites him to acknowledge the archbishop of Ragusa as his superior. After some resistance from local officials, the bishopric of Arbanon was put under the direct dependence of the Pope, as documented in a Papal letter dated in 1188. Later according to the Geziq inscription, Demetrio Progoni, who had been reaccepted in the Catholic Church, had provided funds for the building of the church, which he might have planned to become the seat of the Diocese of Arbanum or a new diocese in the centre of his remaining domain. This is indicated by the fact that the new church was constructed on the site of an older church dedicated to St. Mary (Shën Mëri) but Progoni dedicated the new church to Shën Premte, the patron saint of Arbanum.

==== Catholic Church in the Kingdom of Albania ====
In 1205, during the aftermath of the Fourth Crusade, coastal regions of Byzantine Theme of Dyrrhachium (modern Durrës) were conquered by the Republic of Venice, and organized as the Duchy of Durazzo. Because of this, Pope Innocent III established the Roman Catholic Archdiocese of Tiranë–Durrës as part of the Latin-Rite in 1209.

After the creation of Kingdom of Albania in 1272, a Catholic political structure was a good basis for the papal plans of spreading Catholicism in the Balkans. This plan found also the support of Helen of Anjou, a spouse of King Stefan Uroš I and cousin of Charles of Anjou, as Queen consort of the Serbian Kingdom, who was at that time ruling territories in North Albania. Around 30 Catholic churches and monasteries were built during her rule in North Albania and in Serbia. New bishoprics were created especially in North Albania, with the help of Helen of Anjou. Durrës became again a Catholic archbishopric in 1272. Other territories of the Kingdom of Albania became Catholic centers as well. Butrint in the south, although dependent on Corfu, became Catholic and remained as such during 14th century. The same happened to Vlorë and Krujë as soon as the Kingdom of Albania was created.

A new wave of Catholic dioceses, churches and monasteries were founded, a number of different religious orders began spreading into the country, and papal missionaries also reached the territories of the Kingdom of Albania. Those who were not Catholic in Central and North Albania converted and a great number of Albanian clerics and monks were present in the Dalmatian Catholic institutions. However, in Durrës the Byzantine rite continued to exist for a while after Angevin conquest. This double-line of authority created some confusion in the local population and a contemporary visitor of the country described Albanians as nor they are entirely Catholic or entirely schismatic. In order to fight this religious ambiguity, in 1304, Dominicans were ordered by Pope Benedict XI to enter the country and to instruct the locals in the Latin rite. Dominican priests were also ordered as bishops in Vlorë and Butrint.

Among the Catholic orders operating during that period in Albania included the Franciscan order, Carmelites, Cistercians and Premonstratensians. Also from time to time, the local bishops were appointed from different orders as different popes had their favorites among them.

Krujë became an important center for the spread of Catholicism. Its bishopric had been Catholic since 1167. It was under direct dependence from the pope and it was the pope himself who consecrated the bishop. Local Albanian nobility maintained good relations with the Papacy. Its influence became so great, that it began to nominate local bishops.

The Catholic cause had a drawback while Stephan Dushan ruled in Albania. The Catholic rite was called Latin heresy and Dushan's code contained harsh measures against them. However, the persecutions of local catholic Albanians did not begin in 1349 when the Code was promulgated, but much earlier, at least since the beginning of 14th century. Under these circumstances the relations between local Catholic Albanians and the papal curia became very close.

Between 1350 and 1370, the spread of Catholicism in Albania reached its peak. At that period there were around seventeen Catholic bishoprics in the country, which acted not only as centers for Catholic reform within Albania, but also as centers for missionary activity in the neighboring areas, with the permission of the pope.

=== Catholicism during the Ottoman Empire ===
For four centuries, Albania became a part of the Ottoman Empire and the Islamisation of Albania took place. Albanian Catholics have retained their faith with the aid of:

- The Franciscan missionaries, especially since the middle of the 17th century, when persecutions by Muslim lords set in motion the apostasy of many Albanian villages.
- The College of Propaganda at Rome, especially prominent in religious and moral support of Albanian Catholics. During the 17th and 18th centuries, particularly, it educated young clerics for service on the Albanian missions, contributing then as now to their support and to that of the churches.
- The Austrian Government, which gave about five thousand dollars yearly to the Albanian missions, in its role of Protector of the Christian community under Turkish rule. Apropos of the Austrian interest in Albania, it may be stated that it is the Austrian ambassador who obtains from the Sultan the Berat, or civil document of institution, for the Catholic bishops of Albania.

==== National Synod ====
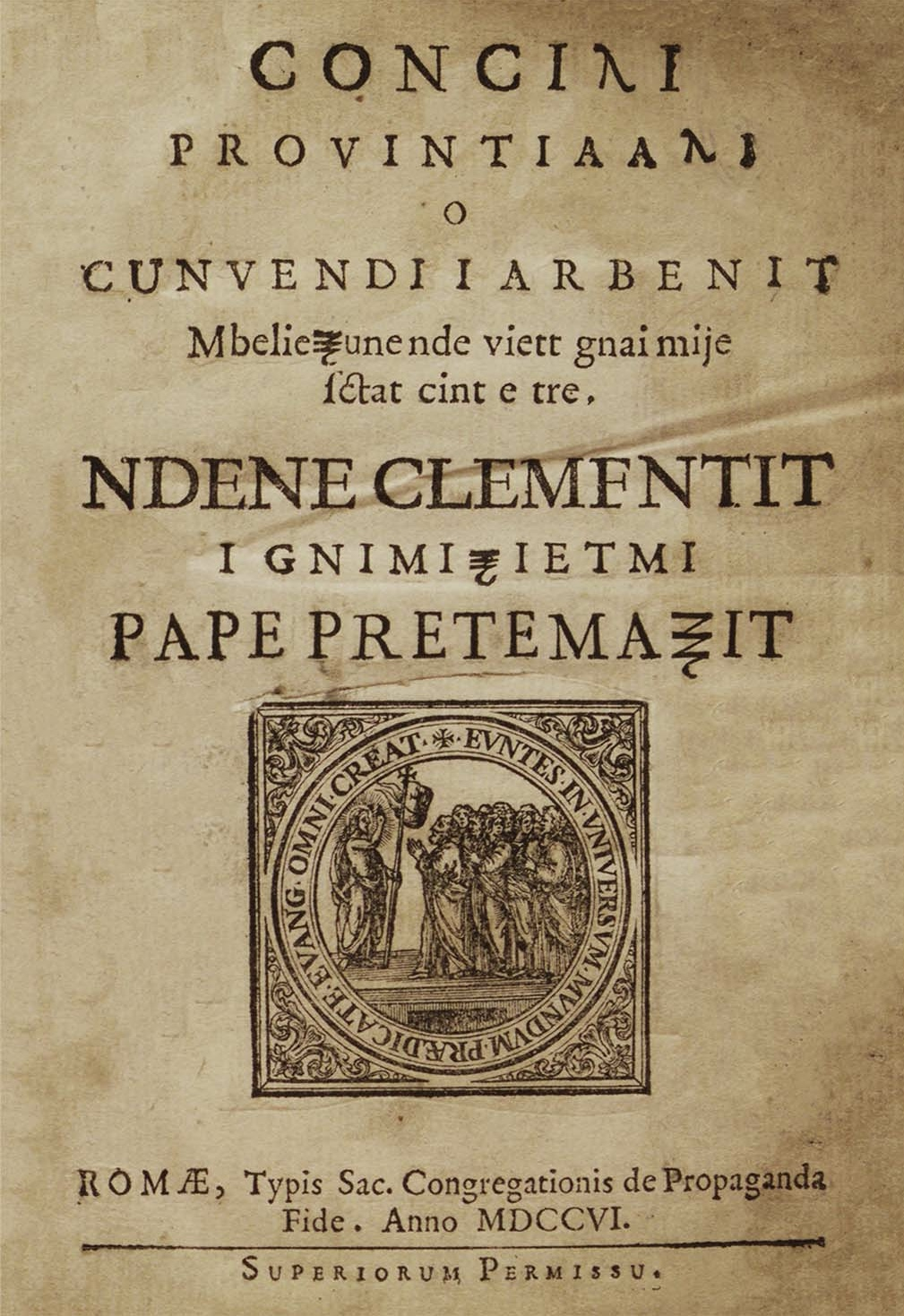
Concilium Provinciale sive Nationale Albanum Habitum Anno M.DCCIII.

The Arbëni Council (Albanian: Kuvendi i Arbënit) was a synod of the Catholic Church held in Mërqia, three kilometers north of present-day Lezhë, on 14–15 January 1703, to affirm the position of the Catholic Church in Albania and to stem the tide of conversions to Islam. The conference was organized during the reign of Pope Clement XI Albani (r. 1700–1721), himself of Albanian origin, and was held under the direction and in the presence of the Croatian archbishop Vincentius Zmajevich (1670–1745) of Bar, who was “apostolic visitor” of Albania, Serbia, and Macedonia. The council was attended by about 200 Catholic dignitaries to discuss the state of the Church, prevent further conversions to Islam, and settle serious property disputes among the various parishes. Both the opening speech by Zmajevich and the resolutions taken by the council were made in Albanian. The records of the meeting, which are of historical, linguistic, and ecclesiastical significance, were sent to Rome for papal inspection and published in Albanian and Latin by the Propaganda Fide in 1706, with the assistance of Francesco Maria Da Lecce O.F.M. They constitute an important source of our knowledge of the language of northern Albania in the early 18th century.

In 1872, Pope Pius IX, alongside Carlo Pooten, the archbishop of Antivar and Scutari, caused a second national synod to be held at Scutari, for the renovation of the popular and ecclesiastical life. A third albanian council was held in 1895.

=== Modern period ===
The Albanian Catholic Church experienced a short-lived period of freedom after the fall of the Ottoman Empire. It ended when the Communists came into power, government, after World War II, and in 1967 constitutionally declared Albania an atheistic state. "The Church was systematically persecuted and neither the structures nor the faithful were spared. All religion symbols in churches were forcefully removed and the buildings resemblance to churches were destroyed, and used for non-religious, degrading and humiliating purposes. The cathedral in Shkoder, for example, was turned into a sports hall, and the cathedral in Durres was used as a puppet theatre. As the Pope said during his visit to Albania in 2014, these were 'decades of atrocious suffering and terrible persecution'."

On 26 November 2019, an earthquake struck Albania. The Catholic Church in Albania held Mass in its churches on 27 and 28 November for earthquake victims and coordinated its relief efforts through local branches of the Catholic charity Caritas Shqiptar.

According to Marco Mencaglia, project director for the Catholic charity Aid to the Church in Need, the Church in Albania faces many challenges: "The Church in Tirana, the capital, in the middle of the country, is particularly in need. There are very few diocesan priests. Pastoral work is carried out by religious communities, with very little means of support. To this one must add the internal migration of people who come from the north of the country in search of a better future in the capital. The south, which has a very small number of Catholics, can be considered first-mission territory, and a starting point for a new mission. Many brave missionaries have arrived in this region to begin new communities where the church was completely unknown."

== Organization ==
Ecclesiastical province of Shkodër–Pult: Archdiocese of Shkodër–Pult Diocese of Sapë Diocese of Lezhë Ecclesiastical province of Tiranë-Durrës: Archdiocese of Tiranë–Durrës Diocese of Rrëshen Apostolic Administration of Southern Albania

The country is currently split into two Ecclesiastical provinces each headed by Archbishops – Shkodër-Pult in the north and Tiranë-Durrës in the centre and south. Shkodrë-Pult has two suffragan Diocese for Lezhë and Sapë. Tiranë-Durrës has one suffragan Diocese for Rrëshen as well as metropolitan authority over the Byzantine Rite Apostolic Administration of Southern Albania, also known as the Albanian Greek-Catholic Church.

Name	Territory	Catholic Population	%
Archdiocese of Shkodër–Pult	Shkodër	166,700	70%
Diocese of Lezhë	Lezhë	86,300	71%
Diocese of Sapë	Zadrima, Vau-Dejes	70,701	35%
Archdiocese of Tiranë-Durrës	Tirana	135,400	11%
Diocese of Rrëshen	Rrëshen	55,300	23%
Apostolic Administration of Southern Albania	Southern Albania	3,000	0.2%

The first known Bishop of present-day Albania was Bassus, who was made Bishop of Scutari (Shkodër) in 387, suffragan to the Bishop of Thessaloniki, Primate of all Illyricum. In the 6th century, Shkodër became a suffrage of Ohrid, in the present-day North Macedonia, which was made the Primate of all Illyricum, and by the early Middle Ages, Shkodër was suffrage of the Bishop of Duklja, in present-day Montenegro. In 1867 Shkodër was united with the Archdiocese of Antivari (Bar, Montenegro), but split in 1886, to become a separate Archdiocese once again with suffragan bishops in Lezhë, Sapë and Pult. The Diocese of Pult (Pulati) – a region north of Shkodër between the present day villages of Drisht and Prekal – dates back to 899, when a Bishop of Pult was appointed as a suffragan to the Bishop of Duklja. The Diocese was once divided into Greater Pult and Lesser Pult but eventually merged with Shkodër in 2005. Drisht, a village north of Shkodër, also used to be a separate Bishopric. The Diocese of Sapë (Sappa) – covering the region of Zadrima between Shkodër and Lezhë – dates back to 1062, and that of Lezhë (Alessio) to the 14th century. The Archdiocese of Durrës was created in the 13th century, as the Bishopric of Albanopolis. It united with Tirana in 1992. The Diocese of Rrëshen was split off in 1996.

The Apostolic Administration of Southern Albania was created in 1939.

Other former ancient Diocese in Albania were Dinnastrum and Balazum.

== Demographics ==
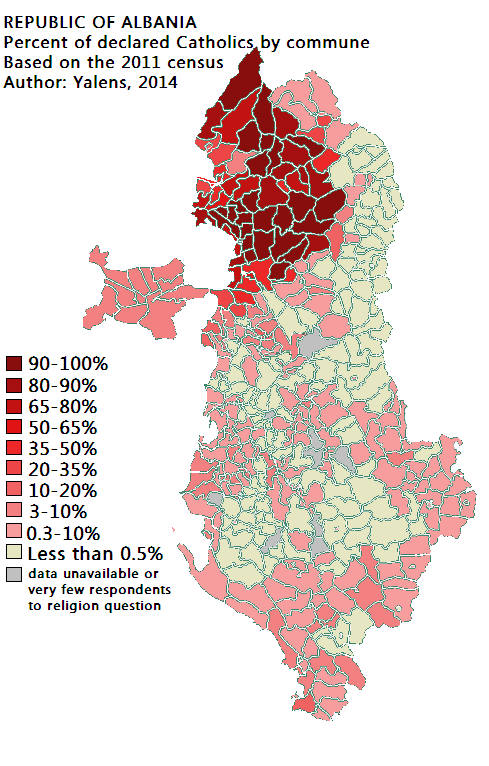
Distribution of Catholic believers in Albania as according to the 2011 census.

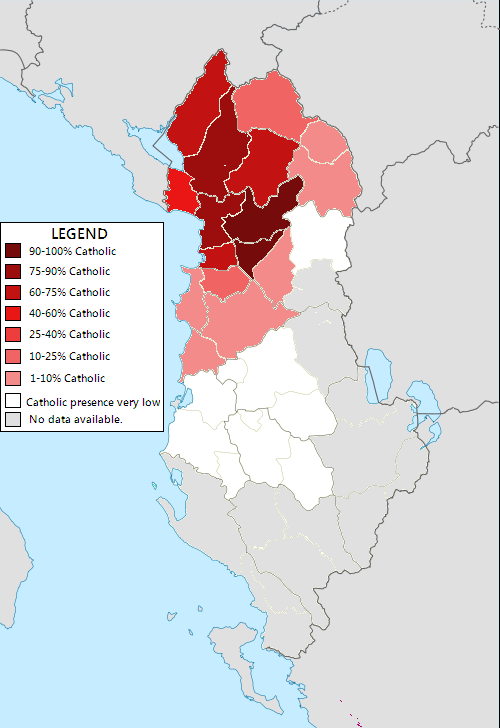
Distribution of Catholics in Albania as according to the 1918 census. Data unavailable in the South and East due to political instability.

According to the 2011 Albanian census, 10.03% of the population affiliated with Catholicism, while 56.7% were Muslims, 13.79% undeclared, 6.75% Orthodox believers, 5.49% other, 2.5% Atheists, 2.09% Bektashis and 0.14% other Christians.

No clear statistics of any province of the former Ottoman empire have been compiled. The CIA World Factbook uses the figures from the 1939 Census of 70% Muslim, 20% Eastern Orthodox Christian, and 10% Catholic.

The 2023 census note that 8% of the population are Catholic Christians.

=== Geographical distribution ===
Catholics form a majority in Lezhë County (72.38%) and the largest religious group in Shkodër County (47.19%).

Share of Catholics in Albania per place (2011 census)
Place	Population (2011)	Catholics (%)
Shllak	671	99.1
Vig-Mnelë	1,509	98.1
Orosh	1,899	97.7
Shalë	1,804	97.7
Hajmel	4,430	96.9
Kaçinar	1,016	96.8
Fierzë	1,302	96.5
Blinisht	3,361	96.0
Pult	1,529	95.7
Rubik	4,454	95.1
Ungrej	1,587	93.8
Kelmend	3,056	93.5
Kallmet	4,118	93.4
Fan	2,977	93.4
Gjegjan	2,846	92.6
Ulëz	1,229	92.6
Kolsh	4,228	92.4
Dajç	3,834	92.0
Rrëshen	8,803	91.8
Kthellë	2,209	91.5
Zejmen	5,660	91.0
Shosh	304	90.9
Shënkoll	13,102	87.4
Temal	1,562	86.1
Balldre	6,142	85.4
Velipojë	5,031	84.5
Lekbibaj	1,207	84.1
Selitë	745	82.5
Kastrat	6,883	82.4
Qelëz	1,761	82.0
Qafë-Mali	1,548	81.5
Qerret	1,498	81.0
Iballë	1,129	78.2
Vau i Dejës	8,117	77.0
Fushë-Arrëz	2,513	73.3
Shëngjin	8,091	72.4
Fushë-Kuqe	5,460	71.3
Dajç	3,885	71.1
Rrapë	1,357	69.9
Guri i Zi	8,085	66.4
Lezhë	15,510	65.3
Shkrel	3,520	62.5
Laç	17,086	60.7
Bushat	14,149	57.4
Rrethinat	21,199	47.4
Blerim	913	46.6
Mamurras	15,284	36.9
Bërdicë	5,773	36.4
Baz	2,228	32.9
Milot	8,461	32.7
Kodër-Thumanë	12,335	31.0
Shkodër	77,075	29.9
Bubq	5,951	29.2
Fierzë	1,607	28.3
Gruemirë	8,890	26.1
Llugaj	1,787	24.0
Pukë	3,607	22.5
Ana e Malit	3,858	21.6
Qendër	4,740	21.2

== Gallery ==
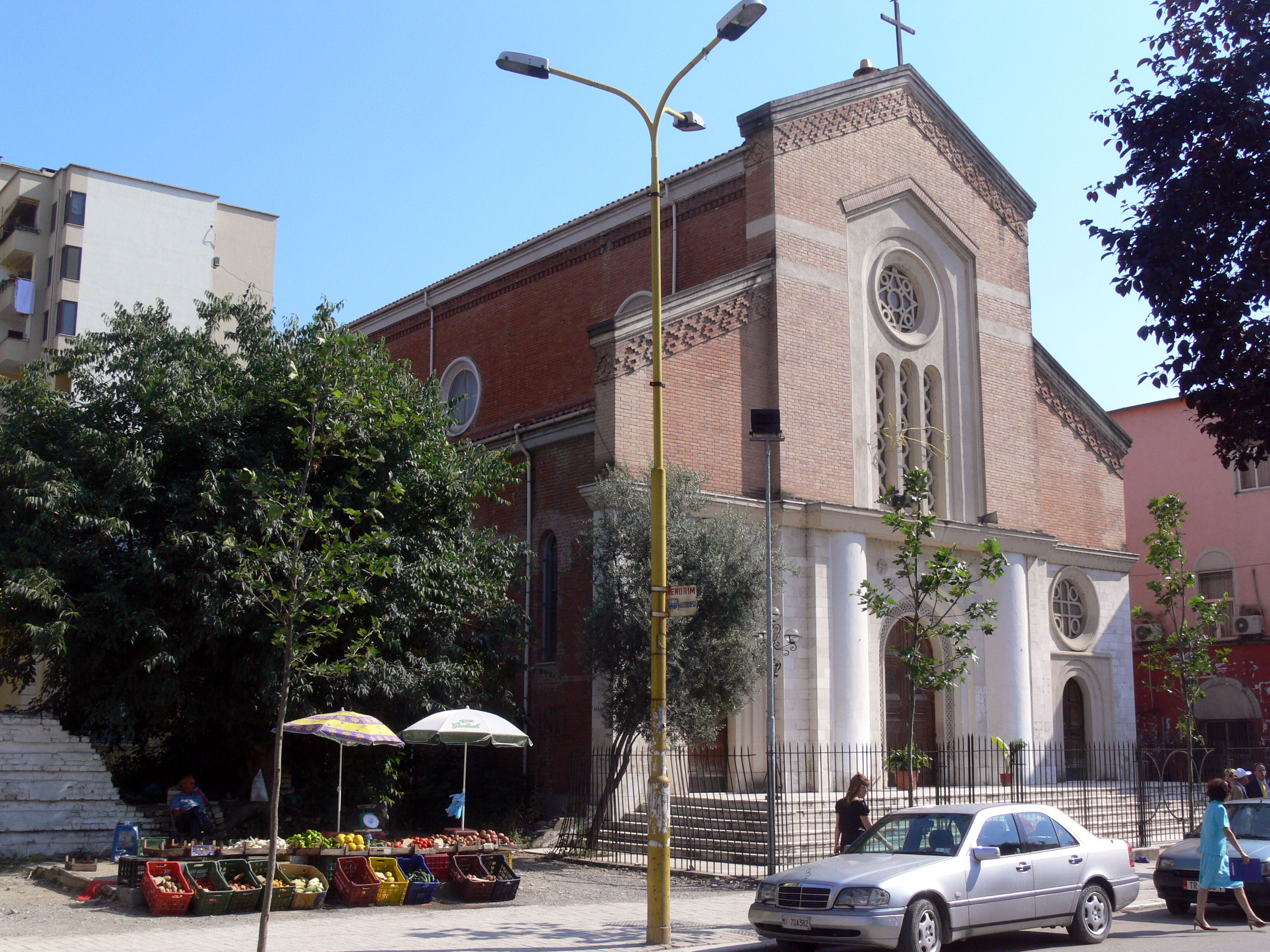
One of Tirana's Catholic churches.

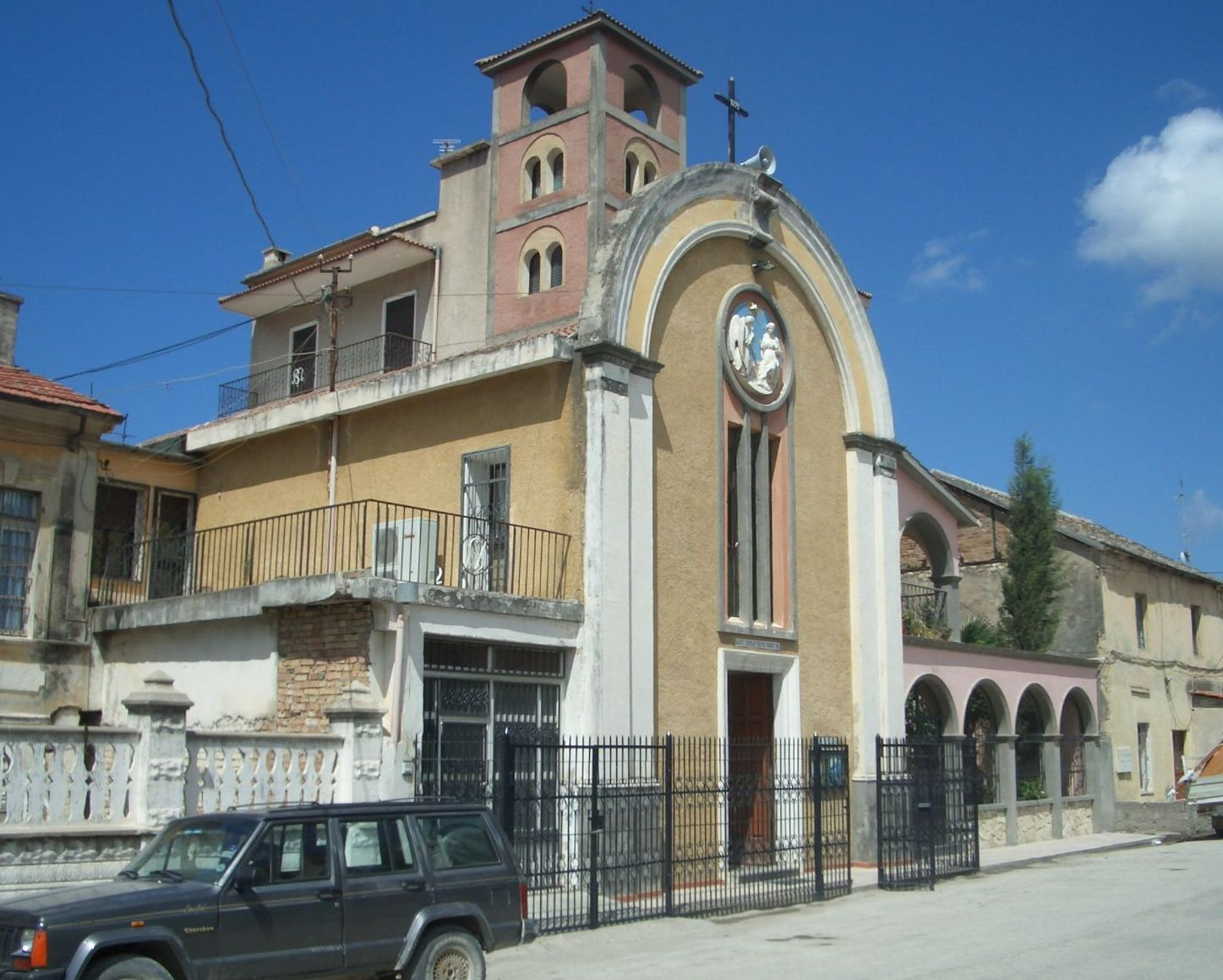
Old Catholic church in Vlora.

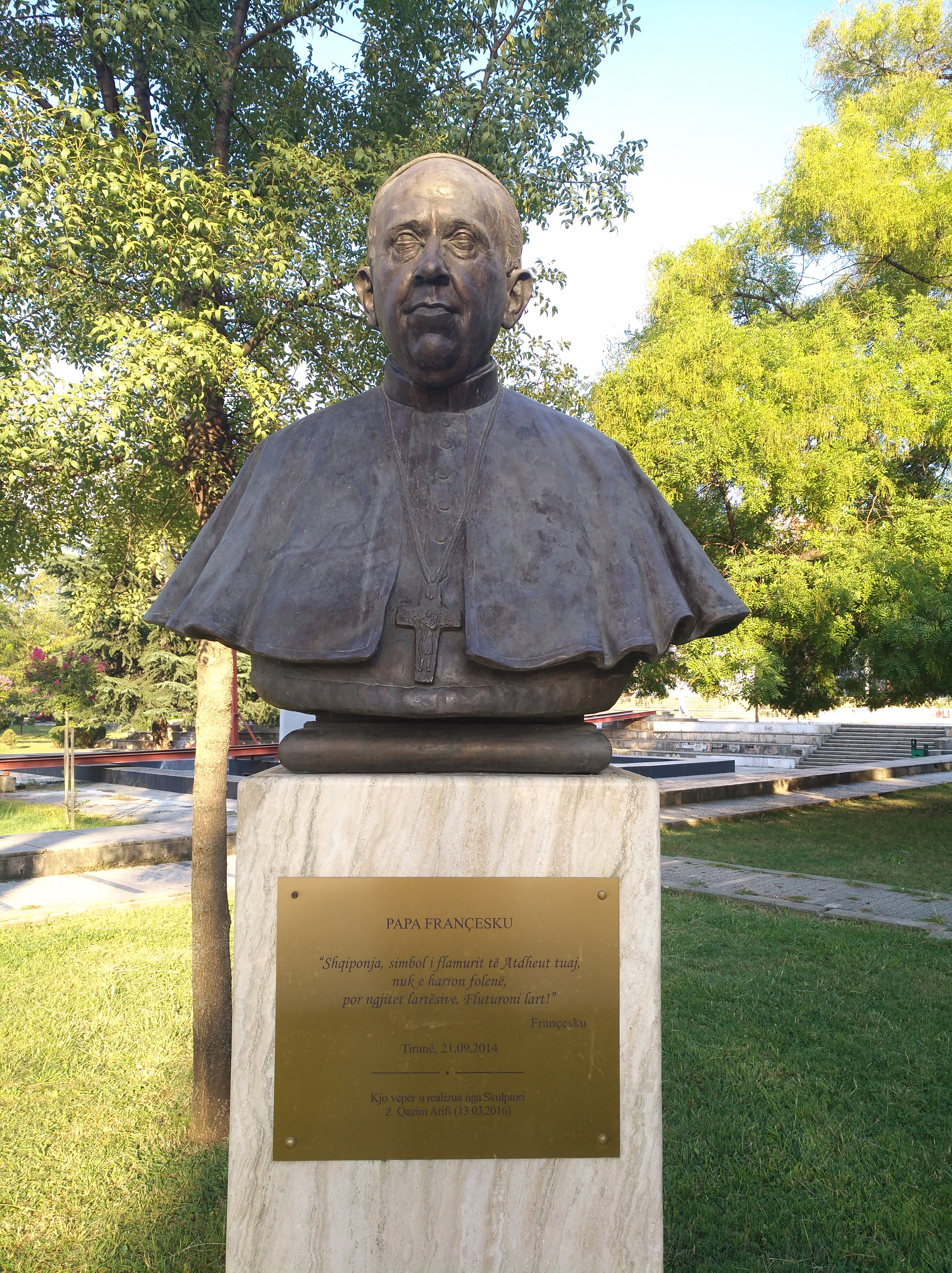
Pope Francis Bust in Tirana

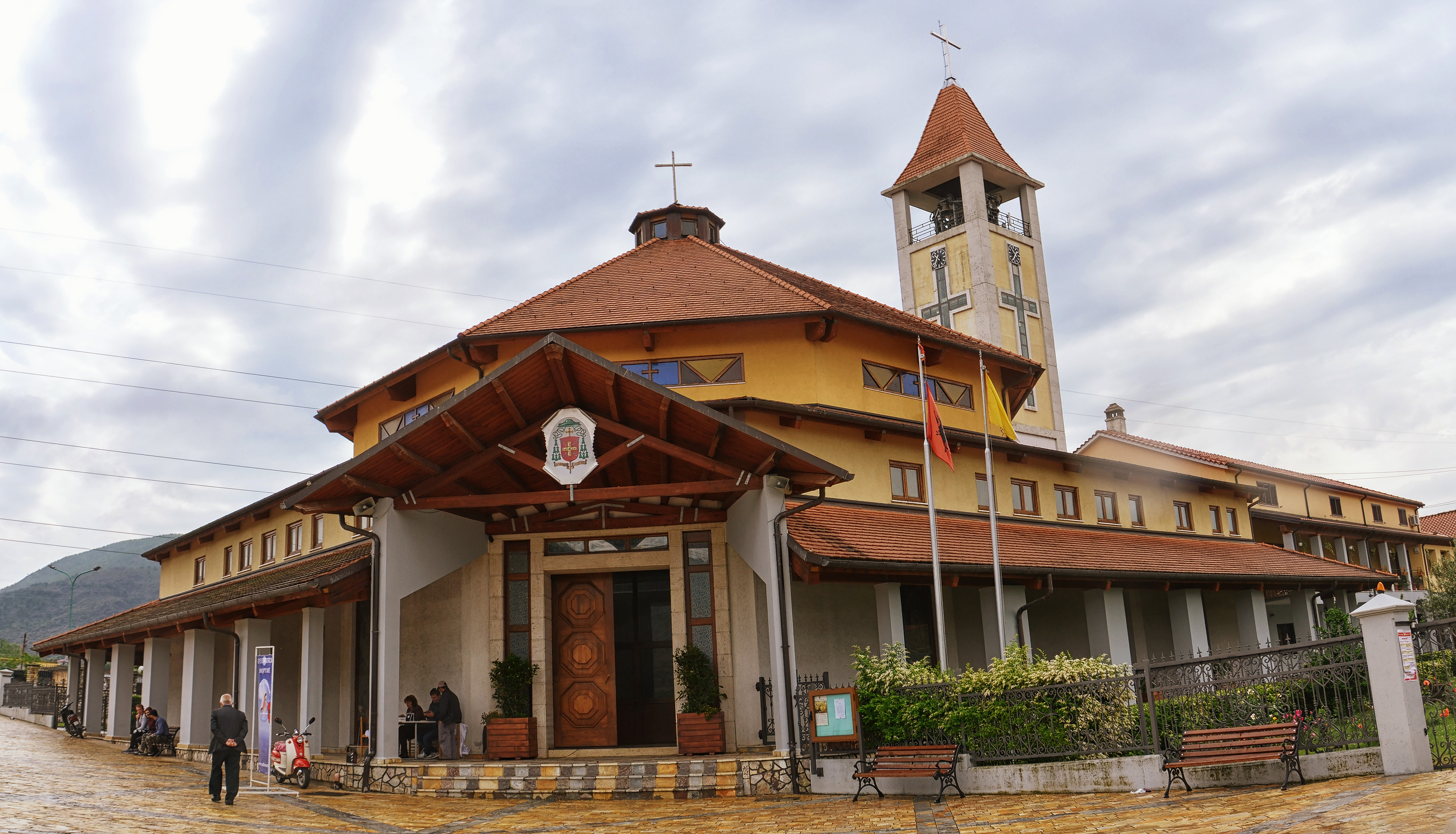
Mother Teresa Cathedral, Vau i Dejës

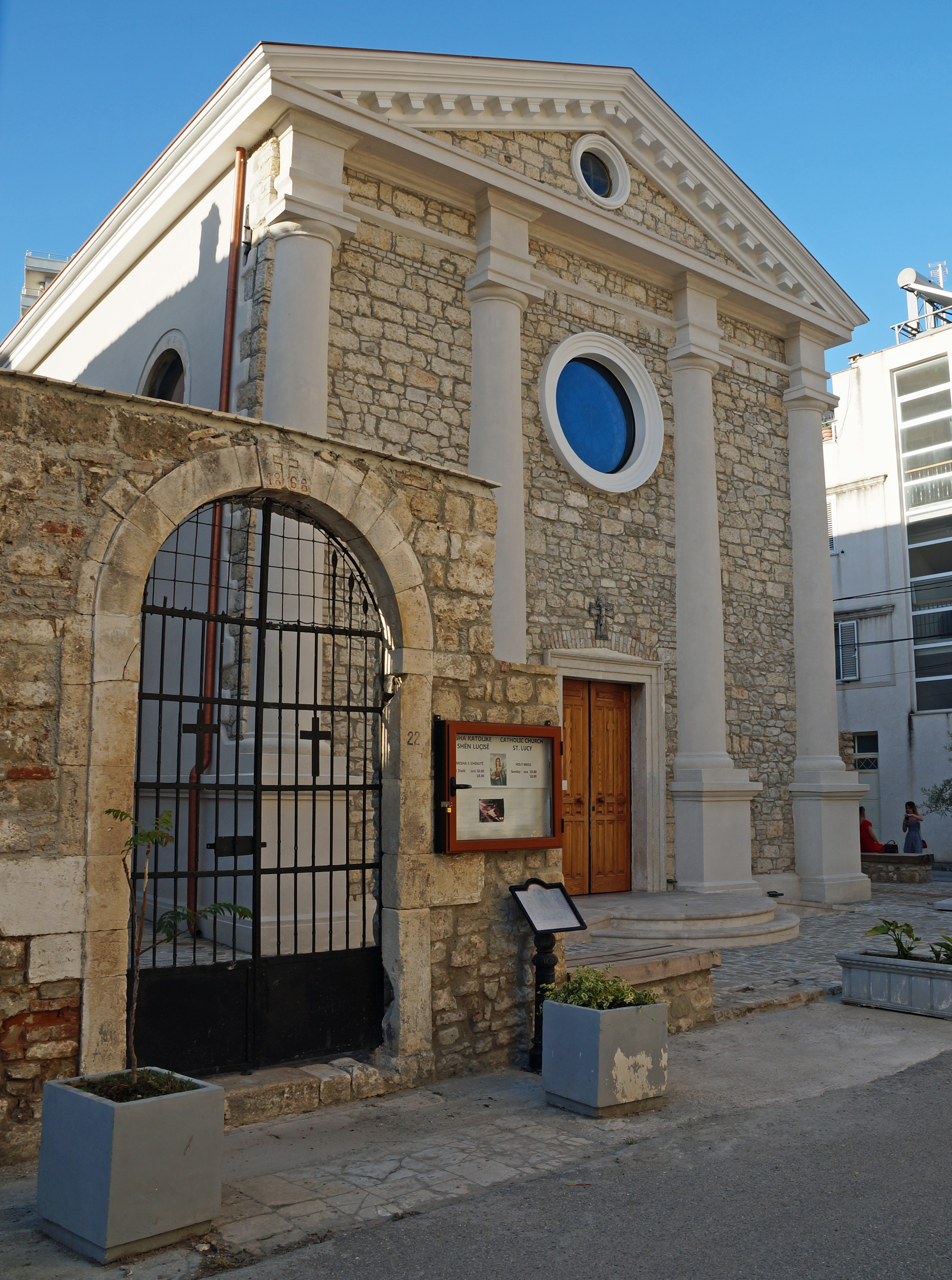
St Lucia Cathedral, Durrës

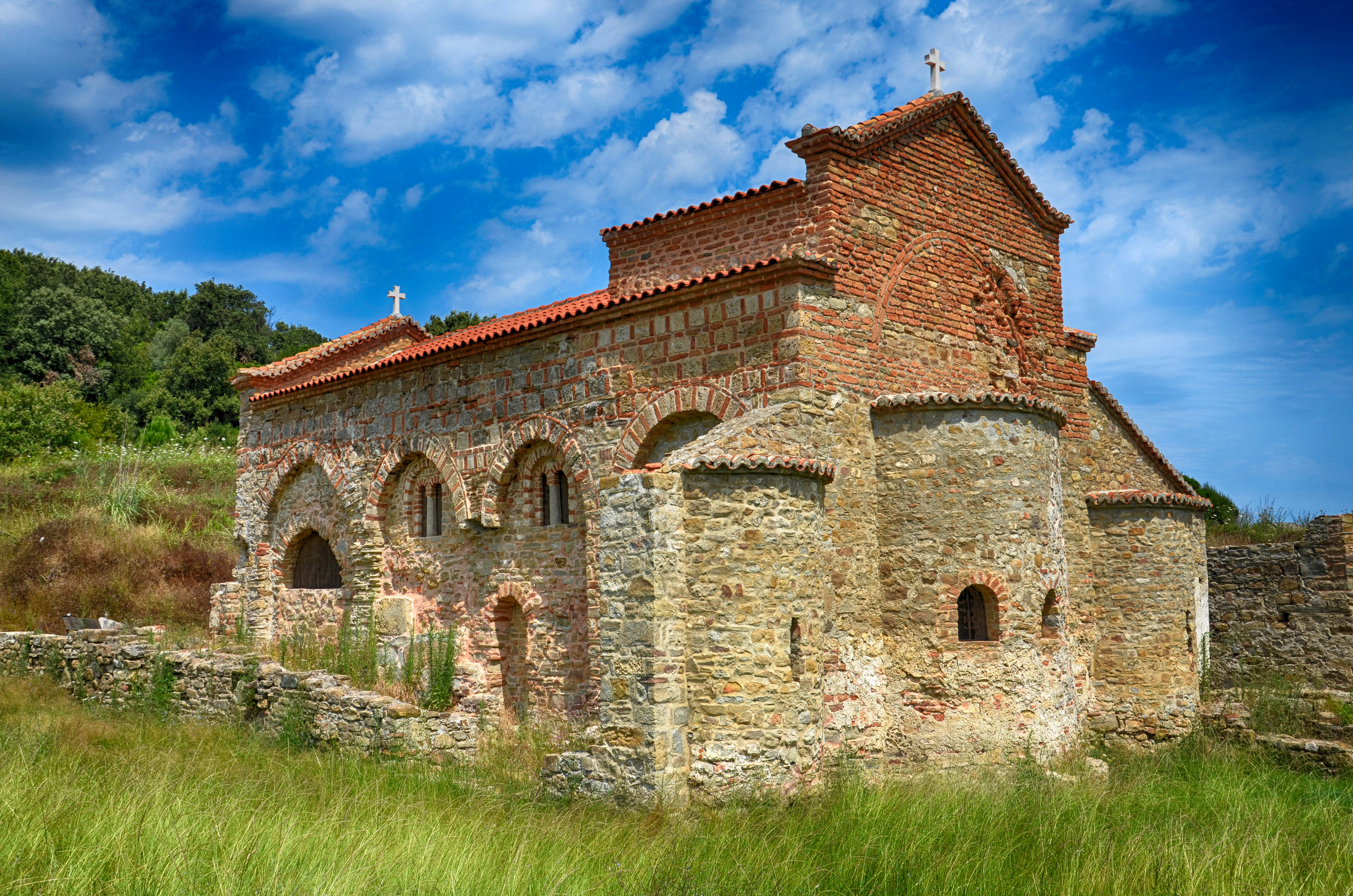
St Anthony Church at Rodon Cape along the Albanian Adriatic coast

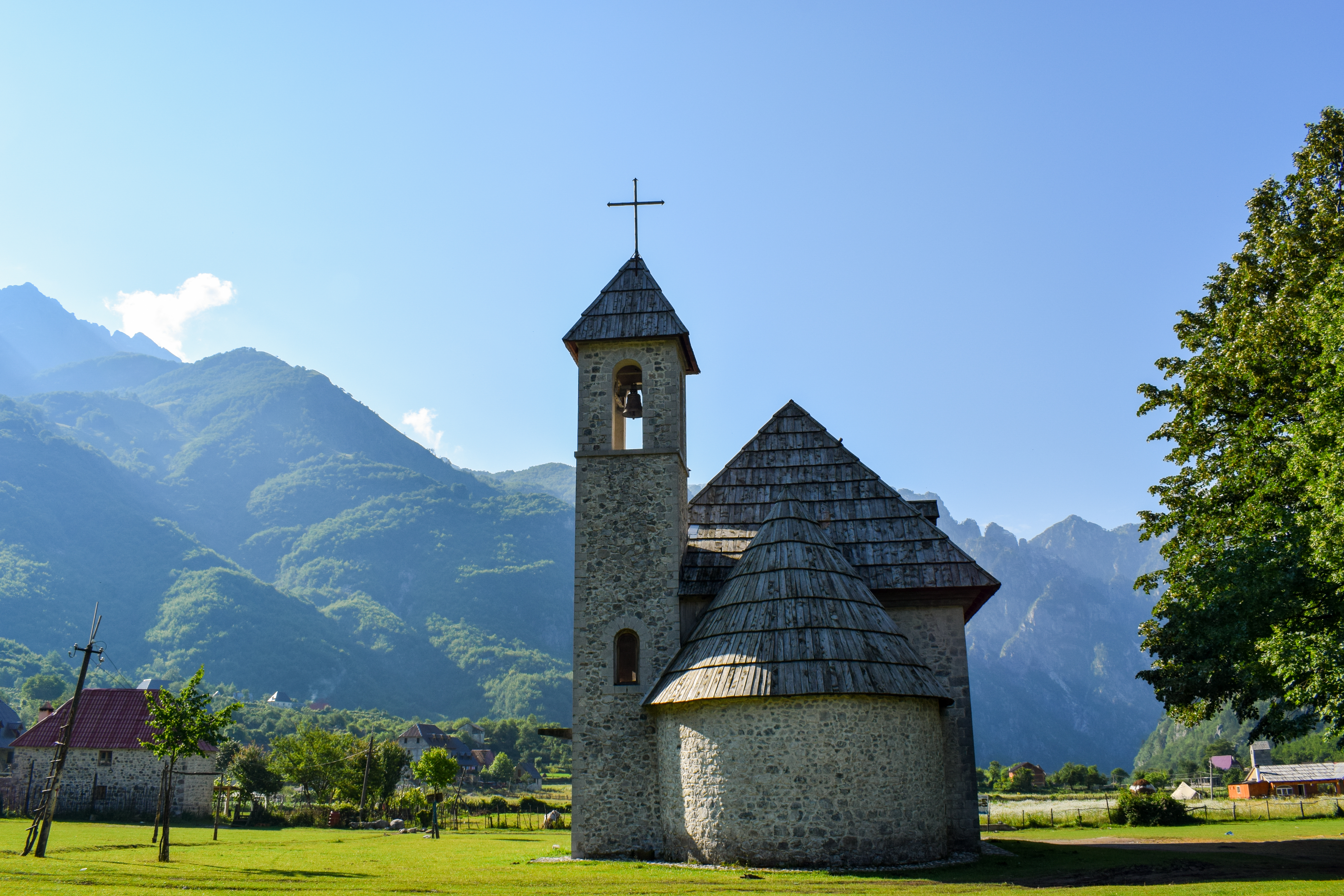
Catholic Church in Theth

== See also ==
- Religion in Albania
- Christianity in Albania
- Protestantism in Albania
- Episcopal Conference of Albania
- Jesuits in Albania
- Albanian Greek Catholic Church
- Italo-Albanian Catholic Church
- Catholic Church by country

== Sources ==
- William Martin Leake, Travels in Northern Greece (London, 1835)
- Élisée Reclus, The Earth and its Inhabitants (New York, 1895, Eng. tr.): Europe, I, 115-126
- Gustave Léon Niox, Péninsule des Balkans
- Edith Durham, Travels
- John Gardner Wilkinson, almatia and Montenegro (1848)
- Herder, Konvers. Lex., s. v.
- Ami Boué, la Turquie d'Europe (Paris, 1889)
- Alexandre Degrand, Souvenirs de la Haute-Albanie (Paris, 1901)
- Emanuele Portal, Note Albanesi (Palermo, 1903)

The documents of the medieval religious history of Albania are best found in the eight volumes of Daniele Farlati, Illyricum Sacrum (Venice, 1751-1819). See also Augustin Theiner, Vetera Monumenta Slavorum meridionalium historiam illustrantia (Rome, 1863 sqq.). Ecclesiastical statistics may be seen in O. Werner, Orbis Terrarum Catholicus (Freiburg, 1890), 122-124, and 120; also in the Missiones Catholicæ (Rome, Propaganda Press, triennially).
