= List of people from Shkodër =

The following are notable people who were either born, raised or have lived for a significant period of time in Shkodër.

== List ==
- Queen Teuta, reign 231-227 BC
- King Gentius, reign 181-168 BC
- Fahrettin Altay, hero of Turkish War of Independence, comrade of Mustafa Kemal Atatürk
- Muhammad Nasiruddin al-Albani, was an Albanian Islamic scholar who specialised in the fields of hadith and fiqh
- Hasan Rıza Pasha, He was the main commander during the Siege of Shkodër and became the symbol of resistance against the Serbians
- Ramiz Alia, last Communist leader of Albania
- Arilena Ara, Singer.
- Marin Barleti, 15th century Albanian historian and priest
- Cevdet Belbez, Ottoman governor of Van
- Marin Beçikemi, 15th century Albanian philosopher, orator, and professor
- Bushati family, prominent Ottoman Albanian family
- Cafo Beg Ulqini, Albanian Nationalist
- Elhaida Dani, The Voice of Italy winner and Albanian Eurovision representative
- Simon Gjoni, composer
- David Tukiçi, singer and composer, winner of the 1969 and 1986 edition of Festivali i Këngës
- Karl Gurakuqi, Linguist and folklorist.
- Luigj Gurakuqi, One of the leaders of the Albanian national movement.
- Elis Guri, former world champion Greco-Roman wrestler
- Anton Harapi, franciscan friar
- Kolë Idromeno, painter and photographer
- Prenkë Jakova, author of the first Albanian opera.
- Zef Jubani, folklorist and activist of the Albanian National Awakening
- Irhan Jubica, writer and publisher
- Branko Kadija, communist, People's Hero of Albania
- Hamza bey Kazazi, fighter
- Palokë Kurti, footballer, athlete, sports organizer, and sports journalist
- Tinka Kurti, actress
- Vojo Kushi, Albanian World War II hero and People's Hero of Albania
- Jordan Misja, communist, People's Hero of Albania
- Henrik Lacaj, translator and scholar
- Gentian Lulani, visual artist
- Angela Martini, model and former Miss Universe Albania
- Ndre Mjeda, Catholic romantic poet
- Mjeda family, Noble Albanian family
- Hilë Mosi, Politician and poet
- Ndoc Nikaj, priest, historian and writer
- Prend Doçi, priest, historian and writer
- Millosh Gjergj Nikolla, poet (pen name Migjeni)
- Bernardin Palaj, Franciscan cleric, folklorist and poet
- Zef Pllumi, writer, historian, priest
- Erkand Qerimaj, world champion of weightlifting
- Gjergj Radovani, Bishop of Shkodër and later Archbishop of Bar
- Perlat Rexhepi, communist, People's Hero of Albania
- Filip Shiroka, renaissance poet
- Mehmet Shpendi, guerrilla fighter
- Hodo Sokoli, leader of the League of Prizren
- Ramadan Sokoli, ethnomusicologist
- Albert Stanaj, singer and songwriter
- Ibrahim Tukiqi, singer
- Irine Banushi, priest
- Bik Ndoja, singer
- Shyqyri Alushi, singer
- Tonin Tërshana, singer and four-time winner of Festivali i Këngës
- Luçie Miloti, singer
- Vaso Pasha, writer, poet and publicist of the Albanian National Awakening
- Rudi Vata, footballer
- Lazër Vladanji, Archbishop of the Roman Catholic Archdiocese of Bar in the 18th century
- Gjergj Vladanji, Bishop of the Roman Catholic Diocese of Sapë in the 18th century
- Tonin Harapi, composer
- Çesk Zadeja, composer
- Skënder Temali, writer
- Xhezair Zaganjori, Chief Justice of the Supreme Court of Albania
- Medin Zhega (31 January 1946 – 12 June 2012) was an Albanian professional football manager and player, who played as a forward
- Bardhok Biba (January 28, 1920 – August 7, 1949) was an Albanian politician who was a key political figure of the Mirditë region serving as political secretary of the party committee in the district. Biba was also a member of the People's Assembly. He was awarded the title of Hero of the People
- Shuaib Al Arna'ut (1928-2016) He was a well-known Albanian scholar of Hadith in the Islamic World. He was famous for his works on Hadith Methodology, Manuscript Investigation and Research and Hadith Criticism. His family were from Shkodër

== See also ==
- List of Albanians
