= Ernesto Cozzi =

Roman Catholic missionary and ethnologist

Ernesto Cozzi (6 July 1870 – 23 March 1926) was a South Tyrol-born priest of the Catholic Church who worked as a missionary and ethnologist in Albania until, in 1920, he was given the rank of archbishop and made the representative of the Holy See to the Church in Albania.

== Biography ==
Ernesto Cozzi was born in Trent, in the South Tyrol, in the Austro-Hungarian Empire, on 6 July 1870. He became a priest of the Catholic Church and served as a military chaplain in Bolzano. From May 1901 he was a parish priest and missionary to the northern mountain tribes of Albania. Albania was then under Ottoman rule, with Austria-Hungary providing for its Catholic population. Cozzi publicly espoused Albanian independence. In 1914 he was briefly an archbishop's secretary and in 1915 was sent on a diplomatic mission to Poland. With the Austro-Hungarian invasion of Albania in 1916, he became a military chaplain again. At the end of World War I, he returned to Albania and became a parish priest in Obot.

In 1919 he was appointed an apostolic visitor and traveled throughout Albania in 1920 to produce a report for the Congregation for the Propagation of the Faith (CPF) and on 12 November Pope Benedict XV named him the first Apostolic Delegate to Albania. On 16 December Pope Benedict named him a titular archbishop as well, the customary rank for papal diplomats. Cozzi received his episcopal consecration on 27 December from Cardinal Willem van Rossum, Prefect of the CPF.

Most of his research, written in Italian, was published between 1909 and 1914 in Anthropos, a Viennese scholarly journal, the Revue d’ethnographie et de sociologie, and others. His interests included folklore and superstition, women’s religious observance, blood feuds, and–his most significant contribution–popular legal norms. (Note: A volume of his essays was published in Albanian in 2017. A bibliography appears on the Albania Portal.)

He died on 23 March 1926 (Note: Albanian-language sources give 23 March as the date of his death, while two self-published sources give the date as 23 February.) on board a ferry en route to Bari, Italy. He was initially buried in Bari, but his remains were exhumed, returned to Albania, and buried in Shkodra on 29 May.
