= Shyqyri Alushi =

Albanian singer (1934–2019)

Shyqyri Alushi AM NK
- Born: 10 May 1934; Shkodër, Albanian Kingdom
- Died: 18 March 2019 (aged 84); Shkodër, Albania
- Occupations: Singer; songwriter
- Musical career
- Genre: Folk
- Instruments: Vocals
- Award: Honor of the Nation

Shyqyri Alushi (Albanian pronunciation: [ʃycyˈɾi aˈluʃi]; 10 May 1934 – 18 March 2019) was an Albanian singer of folk and the traditional urban music of Shkodër, also known as aheng.

== Life and career ==
He was born on 10 May 1934 in Bahçallëk, a neighbourhood of Shkodër. Singing from a young age, he first performed in public at the age of ten, with the song Mori drandofilja e kuqe ("O you red rose"). Then, at the age of 17, he became part of the folk group Grupi karakteristik i ahengut shkodran ("The Particular Group of Shkodran Aheng"), performing all over the city. In 1974, he becomes part of the Shkodër variety show group, oftentimes performing alongside fellow folk singer Bik Ndoja. After joining he started performing more serious compositions, such as works from masters like Pjetër Gaci, Mark Kaftalli, Nazmi Lishi, Luan Barova, Shefqet Kruja, Sait Hoxha, etc.

In a 60 year long career, Alushi was awarded Merited Artist of Albania in 1984, Krenaria e qytetit ("City's Pride") in 2000, Çmimi i karrierës ("Career Award") in 1996. He was also a winner of Disku i artë ("Golden Disc"), a countrywide marathon of folk music.

== Selected songs ==
- "Thotë lulja për lulen"
- "Kur natyra kenka veshur"
- "Nëpër fusha në kodrina"
- "Pranvera filloi me ardhë"
- "O bilbil më i bukuri i shpendëve"
- "T’parën herë kur jena pa"
- "Eni more shokë"
