= Bobot =

Bobot may refer to:

- Bobot language, a language of Indonesia
- Bobot, Trenčín District, a village in Slovakia
- Bobot, Albania, a village in Albania
- Edgar Mortiz (born 1954), also known as Bobot, Filipino actor and singer

== See also ==
- Bobot Adrenaline, American rock band
