= Irine Banushi =

Albanian senior Orthodox priest (1906–1973)

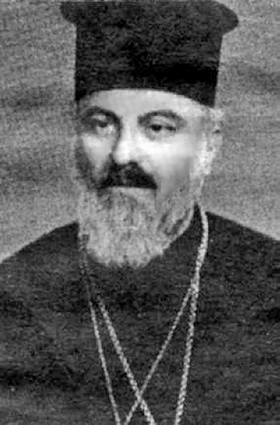
Bishop Irine before 1956

Bishop Irine (secular name Ilia Banushi; Shkodër, August 18, 1906 – Tirana, November 25, 1973) was an Albanian senior Orthodox priest and teacher.

== Biography ==
He was born Ilia Banushi, son of Nedo Banushi and Nikolla Kolo. He came from a family of Aromanian roots. He graduated from Illyricum High School in 1925 and from the Saint Petar of Cetinje Orthodox Seminary at the Cetinje Monastery in 1931. He earned his Doctorate of Theology at the University of Belgrade in 1938. Banushi was detained in Mantua for a year after the Italian invasion of Albania in 1939.

After his return home, Banushi was appointed by the Orthodox Church presidency as professor at the “Apostle Paul” National Seminary. The Minister of Education appointed him professor of Latin language and history at the State Gymnasium in Tirana in October 1941. On January 30, 1942, he was ordained a hierodeacon, a day later the hieromonk of an archimandrite, and on February 1 he officially became a bishop.
