= Ebu Beker Mosque =

Sunni mosque in Shkodër City, Shkodër County, Albania

- Xhamia Ebu Beker
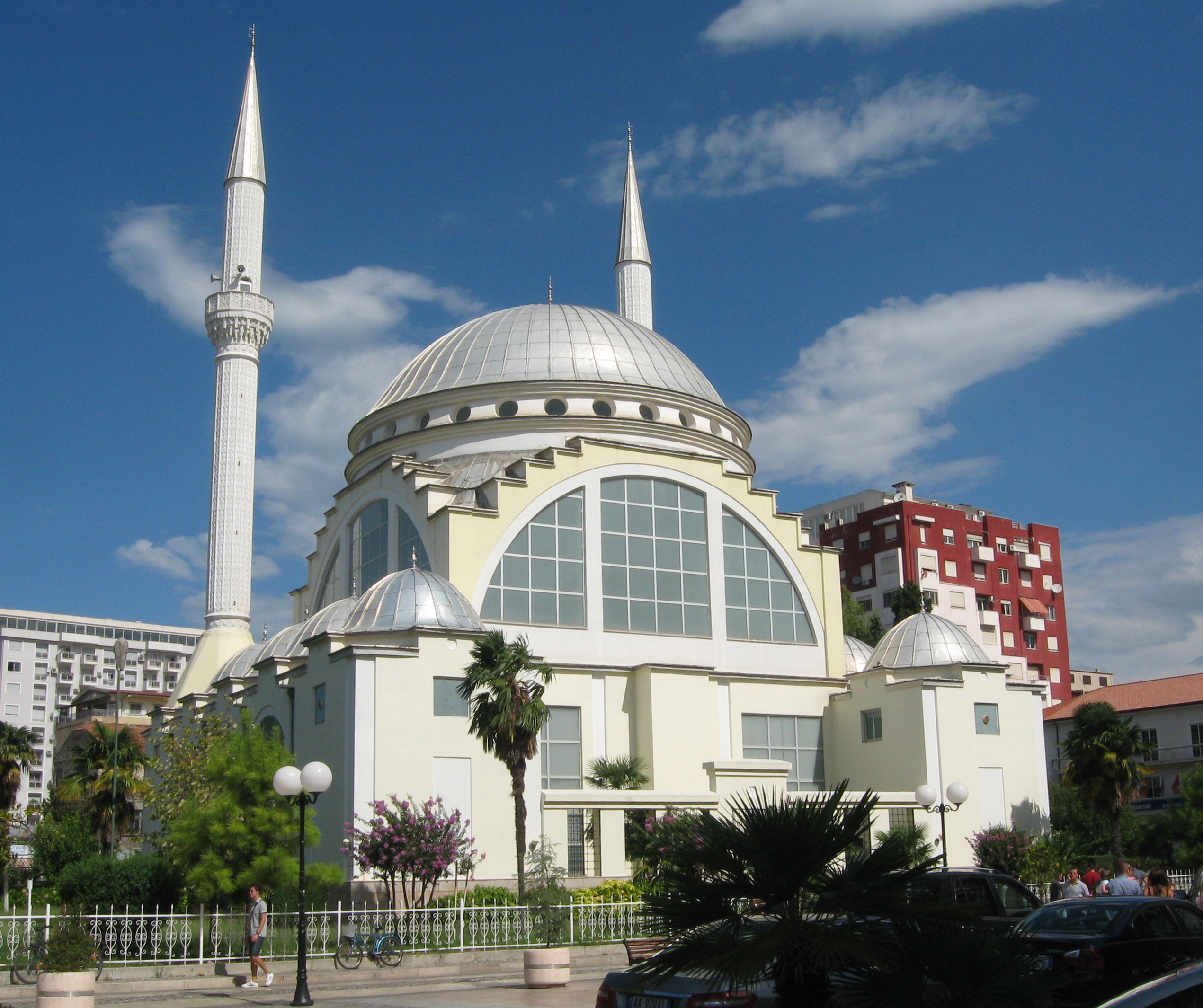
- The mosque in 2017

- Location of the mosque in Albania

Religion
- Affiliation: Sunni Islam
- Ecclesiastical or organizational status: Mosque
- Status: Active

Location
- Location: Shkodër City, Shkodër County
- Country: Albania
- Interactive map of Ebu Beker Mosque
- Coordinates: 42°4′3″N 19°30′50″E

Architecture
- Type: Islamic architecture
- Completed: 1995

Specifications
- Capacity: 1,300 worshipers
- Dome: 1 (main)
- Dome height (outer): 24 m (79 ft)
- Minaret: 2
- Minaret height: 41.11 m (134.9 ft)
- Site area: 623 m^{2} (6,710 ft^{2})

The Ebu Bekër Mosque (Albanian: Xhamia Ebu Beker), also known as the New Fushë Çela Mosque (Albanian: Xhamia e re e Fushë Çela) and sometimes referred to simply as Xhamia e Madhe (transl. Great Mosque), is a Sunni mosque in Shkodër City, Shkodër County, Albania.

== Overview ==
Supported by funding from Saudi entrepreneur Sheikh Zamil Abdullah Al-Zamil, the mosque was designed by ARC Architectural Consultants and built between 1994 and 1995 on the site of the old Fushë Çela Mosque, which was destroyed during the communist era. The new mosque was named after Abu Bakr, the first Rashidun caliph. The inauguration was held on 27 October 1995, and the mosque was renovated in 2008. The mosque is situated at the end of a walkway from the Hotel Colosseo.

The mosque covers a site of 623 square metres (6,710 ft^{2}) and can accommodate 1,300 worshipers. The two minarets are 41.11 metres (134.9 ft) high each and the main dome stretches to 24 metres (79 ft).

=== Former mosque ===
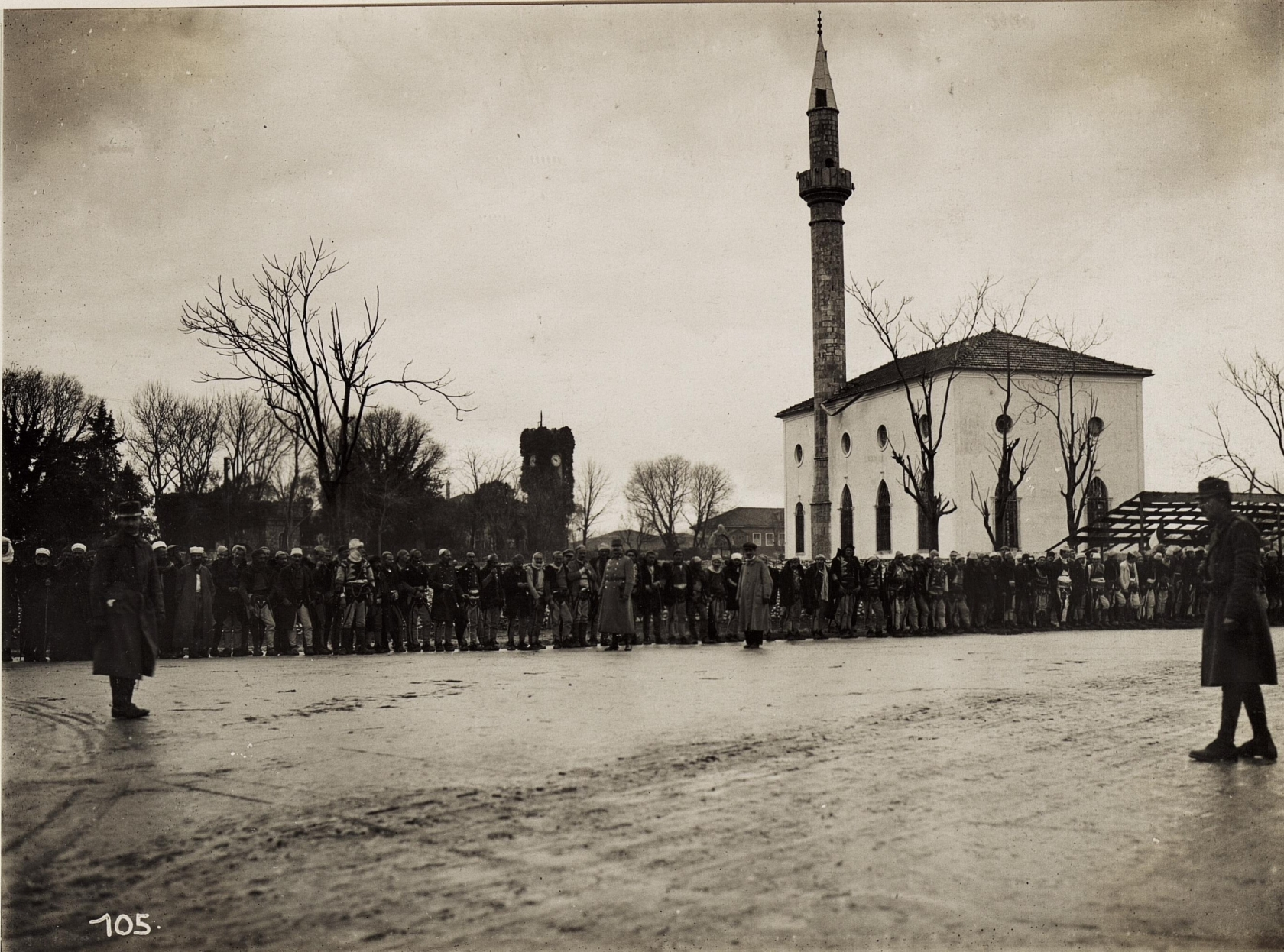
Fushë Çela Mosque (1917)

The former Fushë Çela mosque was historically important in the scholarly learning of the city and attracted notable Islamic scholars and theologians. A legacy of the Ottoman Empire, the former mosque was destroyed by the Communist government, and it once had its own madrasa.

== Gallery ==
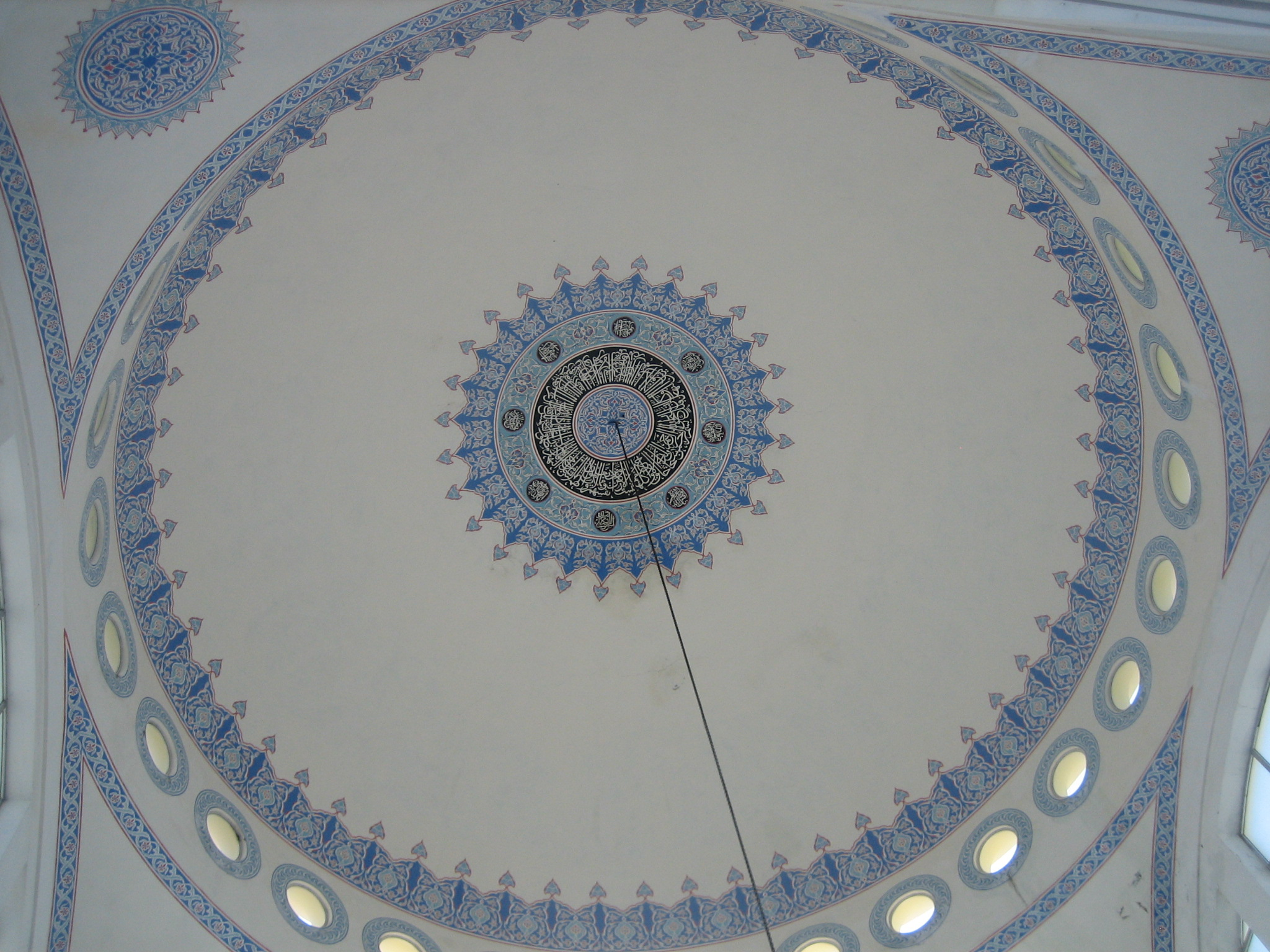
Interior view of the dome

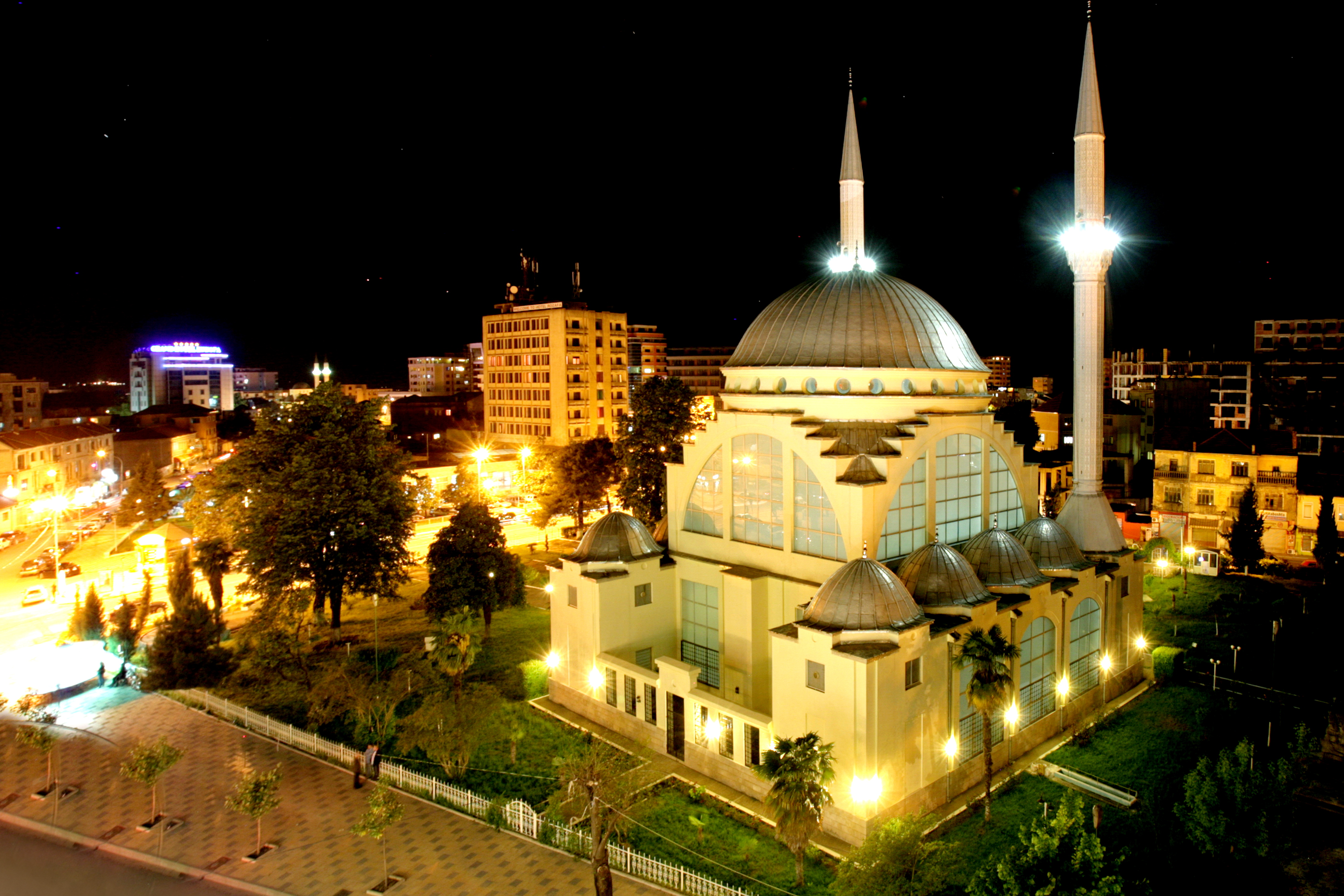
Night view

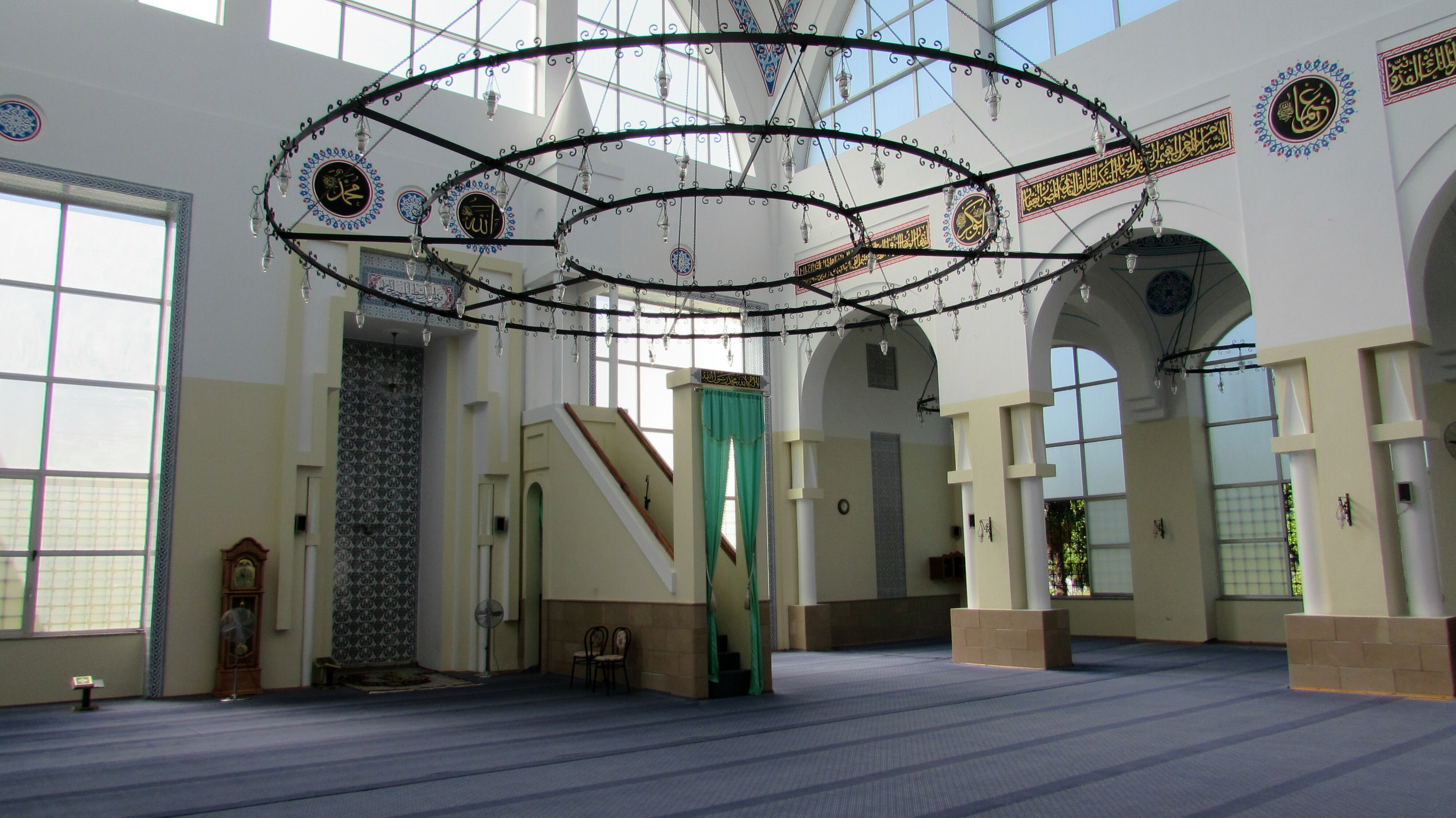
Interior view of mosque

== See also ==
- Islam in Albania
- List of mosques in Albania
