= St. Francis Church, Shkodër =

19th-century Franciscan church in Albania

Franciscan Church
- Kisha Françeskane
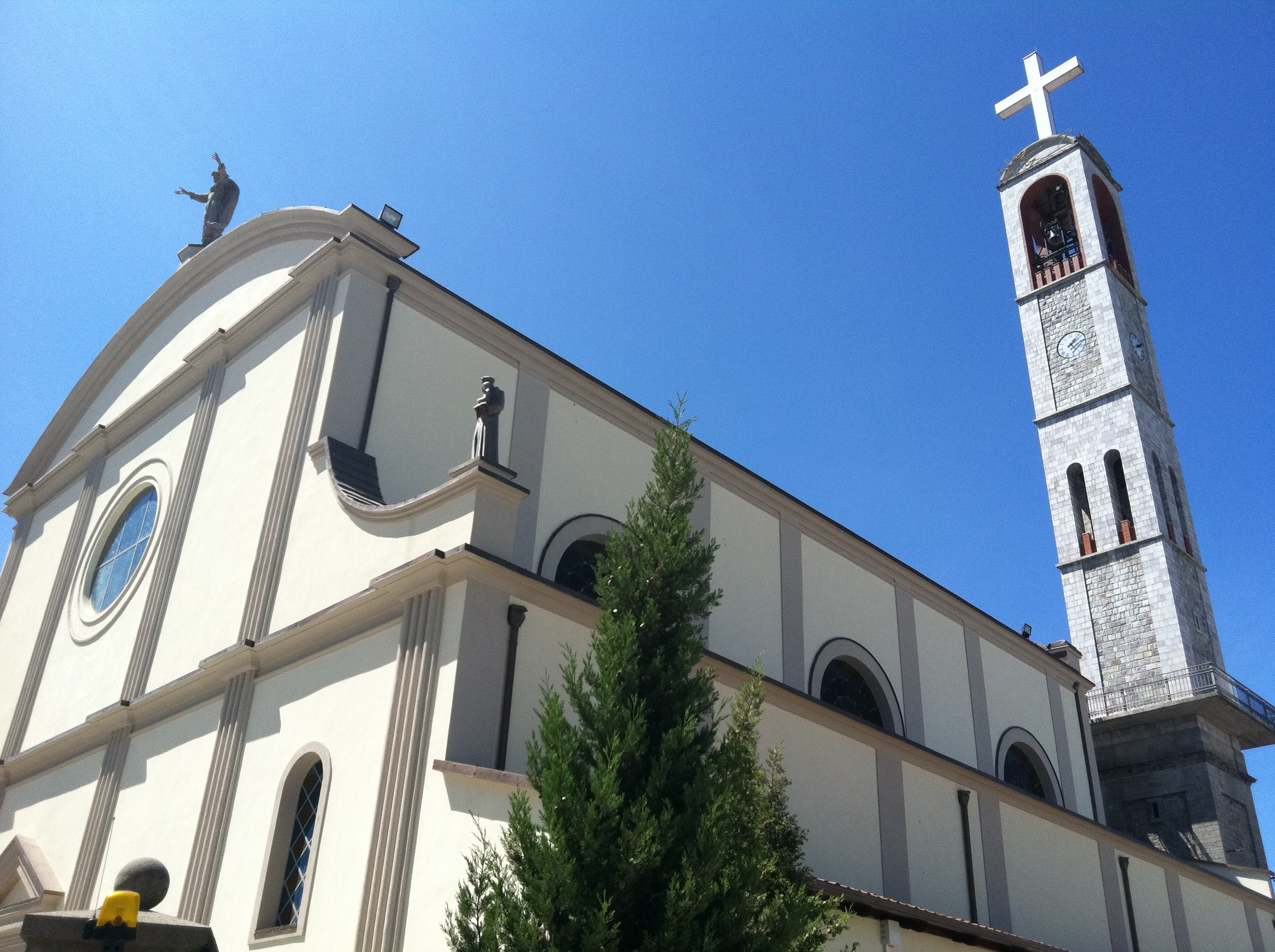
- Interactive map of the Franciscan Church area

General information
- Location: Shkodër
- Coordinates: 42°04′N 19°30′E
- Completed: 1905; 121 years ago

The St. Francis Church is a Franciscan church in the city of Shkodër in northwestern Albania, built in 1905.

== History ==
The Assembly of Gjuhadol was founded in 1861 by the Franciscan Bishop of the Roman Catholic Archdiocese of Shkodër–Pult, Luigj Çiurçisë. Construction on the current building was started by Father Tomë Markoci in 1875, and the grounds were dedicated in 1878 by Father Gjan Pjer Ferrari. In 1902 the franciscan mission in the city of Shkodër earned the permit from a Sultan decree to build a church in the city of Shkodër. Friars Françesk Melkiori and Lorenc Mitroviqi collected alms for construction. Both the church and assembly designs were by Friar Anselm (who died on March 25, 1891) but were enhanced by French engineer Agustin Briott upon resumption in 1902. The construction started outright and in 1905 the building was completed. In January 1947 the Sigurimi (Albanian Secret Police) stored a cache of arms and ammunition in the church. When discovered by the Franciscan priests in outrage, a number of priests of the churches were arrested. The tower of the church and rear wing underwent restoration in 2007.
