= Ana e Malit =

- Administrative unit
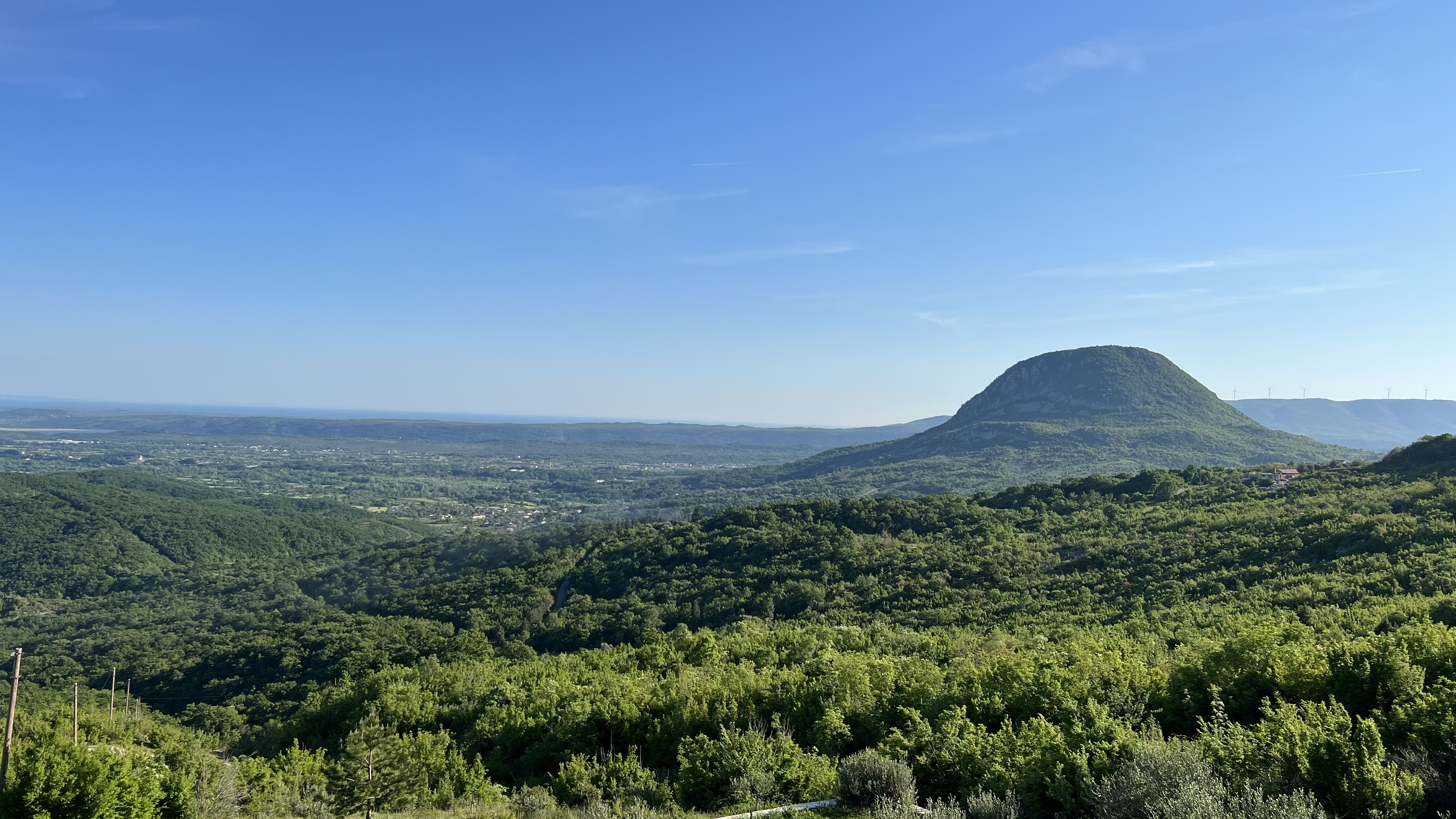
- View of Suma mountain in Ana e Malit and the fields of the surrounding villages

- Location within Albania
- Coordinates: 42°1′N 19°26′E
- Country: Albania
- County: Shkodër
- Municipality: Shkodër
  - Administrative unit: 41.8 km^{2} (16.1 sq mi)

Population (2011)
  - Administrative unit: 3,858
  - Administrative unit density: 92.3/km^{2} (239/sq mi)
- Time zone: UTC+1 (CET)
  - Summer (DST): UTC+2 (CEST)

Ana e Malit is a former municipality in the Shkodër County, in northwestern Albania. At the 2015 local government reform it became a subdivision of the municipality Shkodër. The population at the 2011 census was 3,858. Ana e Malit is also a cultural region which is split between Albania and Montenegro.

== Settlements ==
There are 11 settlements within Ana e Malit.

1. Shtuf
2. Muriqan
3. Oblikë
4. Oblikë e Sipërme
5. Obot
6. Dramosh
7. Babot
8. Vallas
9. Velinaj
10. Vidhgar

== Sources ==
- Hecquard, Hyacinthe (1858). Histoire et description de la haute Albanie ou Guégarie. A. Bertrand. pp. 25–26.
