= Coat of arms of Shkodër =

- Adopted: 1992
- Use: Shkodër Municipality

The Shkodër Coat of Arms is the coat of arms of Shkodër. The Arms of Shkodra Portrays a golden S to represent the first letter of the name Shkodër, it is accompanied by two eight-pointed white stars with a red rectangle surrounding it, below is a blue background with a white intersecting grid.

== History ==
The Coat of arms of Shkodër can be traced back to the 14th century with a coin depicting the current arms of Shkodër in (1375-1400). When it was an autonomous city.

=== Statutes of Shkodër ===
The Statutes of Shkodër represent the self-governance of Shkodër under Venetian rule, composed of 279 chapters written in 15th-century Venetian. The Statutes integrate Albanian traditions such as Besa and Gjakmarrja. The original document, a 40-page parchment copied by Marino Dulcic in the 15th century, was discovered in the Museo Correr in Venice by historian Lucia Nadin and published widely in 1997.

The Statutes, remained effective through the Venetian conquest and reflect the legal life of Shkodër until the Ottoman takeover in 1479. The ordinances covered various aspects of city life, from governance to family law. The Statutes were republished in 2002 with a modern Albanian translation and in a more faithful edition in 2010.

At the top of the Statutes, it displays the coat of arms of Shkodër.The coat of arms is scudo-shaped, featuring a golden double-headed eagle with royal crowns on each head, set against a blue background. The lower half contains three black five-leaf rosettes on a golden field. Above this, on the left, is a black one-headed eagle with outstretched wings and an open beak, marked by a thin red tongue, perched on black headwear. On the right is a silver dog standing on black headwear, holding a bone and a silver banner inscribed with "FATIS•CEDO•" (Latin for "Fate yielded"), all surrounded by floral decorations in red, blue, and gold. Symbolically, the proud eagle represents the city's prosperous past, while the dog with its bone signifies Scutari's subjugation following the Ottoman conquest.

== Gallery ==
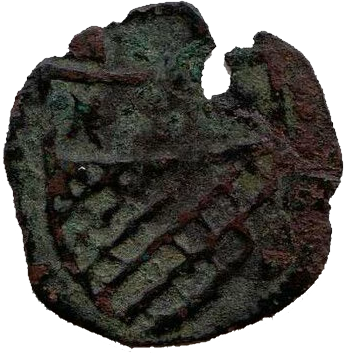
Coin of Shkoder in the 14th century

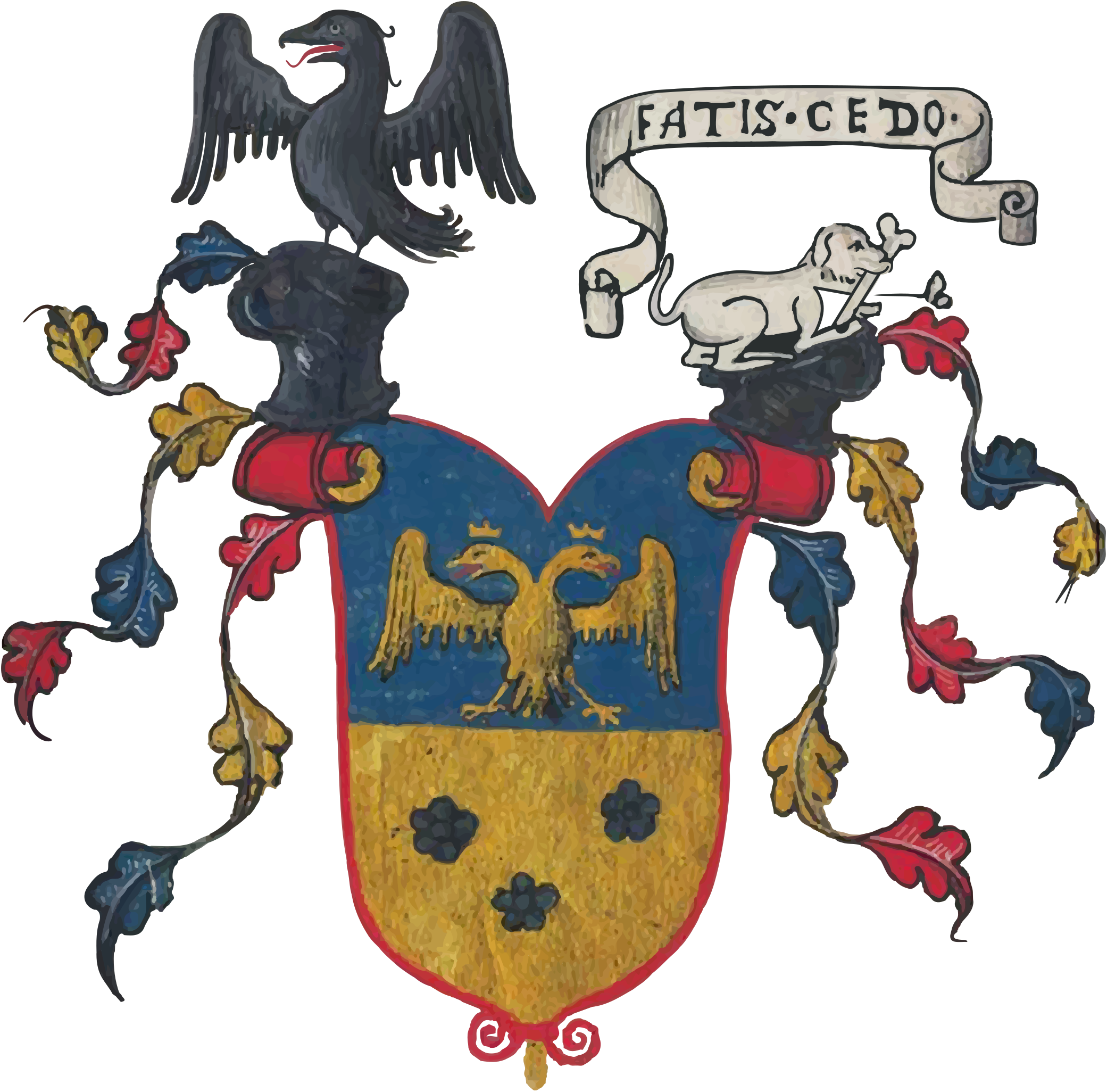
Coat of arms of the Statutes of Scutari (1330–1469)

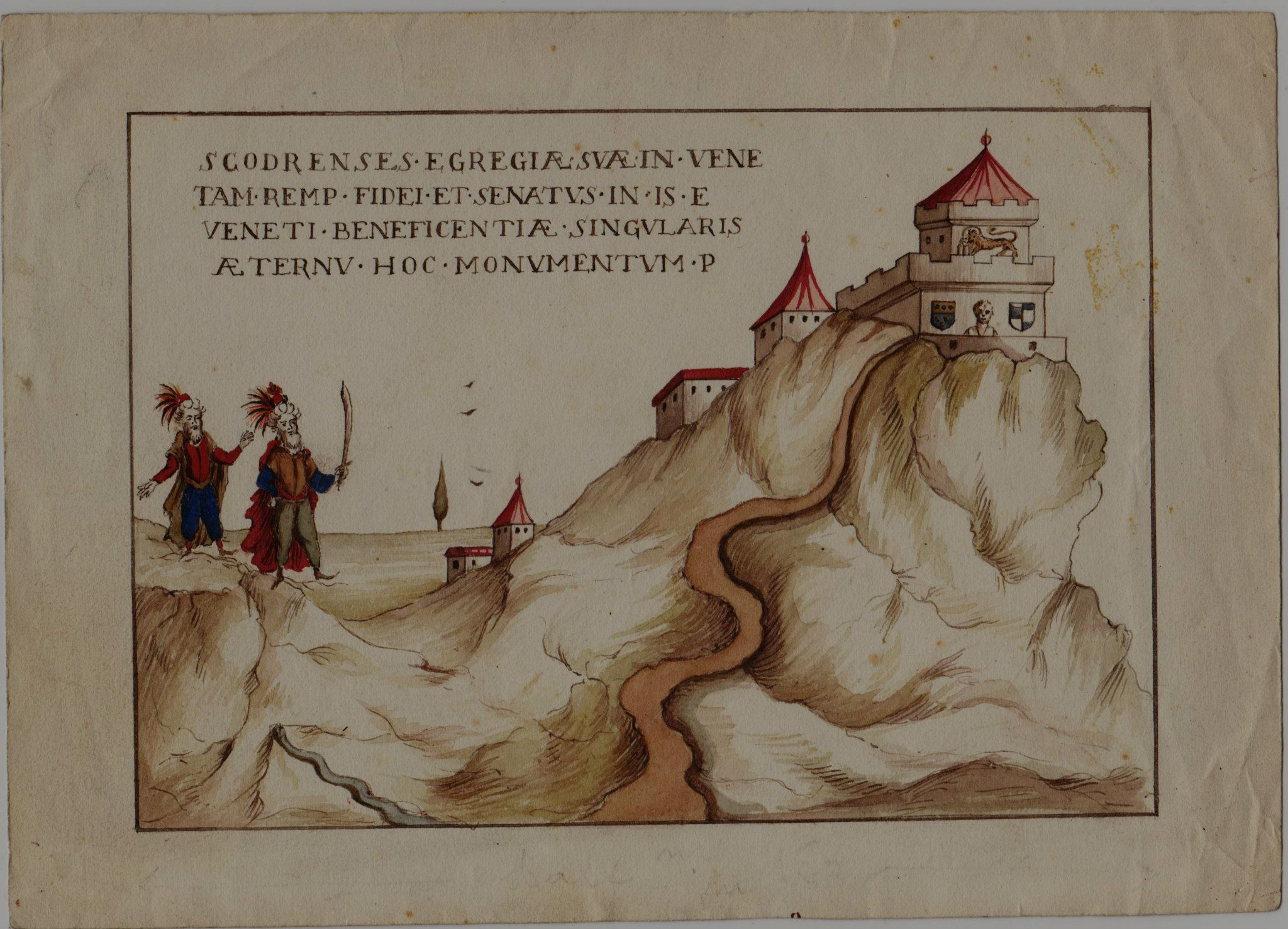
Relief Commemorating the Siege of Shkodra at the former Scuola degli Albanesi. Two coat of arms can be seen on the castle.

== See also ==
- Flag of Shkodër
