= Obot =

- Village
- Location within Albania
- Coordinates: 42°0′58″N 19°26′0″E
- Country: Albania
- County: Shkodër
- Municipality: Shkodër
- Administrative unit: Ana e Malit
- Time zone: UTC+1 (CET)
  - Summer (DST): UTC+2 (CEST)

Obot (also: Obot i Ri) is a settlement in the former Ana e Malit municipality, Shkodër County, northern Albania. At the 2015 local government reform it became part of the municipality Shkodër.
