= Vallas (surname) =

Vallas is a surname. Notable people with the surname include:

- Léon Vallas (1879–1956), musicologist and biographer
- Jean-Louis Vallas (1901–1995), French poet
- Paul Vallas (born 1953), Chicago Public Schools administrator and mayoral candidate
- Spyros Vallas (born 1981), Greek football player
