= Bik Ndoja =

Albanian singer (1925–2015)

Bik Ndoja AM NK
- Born: Ludovik Ndoj Gjergji; 13 August 1925; Shkodër, Albania
- Died: 27 December 2015 (aged 90)
- Occupations: Singer; Composer; Actor
- Musical career
- Genres: Folk
- Instruments: Vocals

Ludovik Ndoj Gjergji (Albanian pronunciation: [ludɔˈvik əndɔj ˈɟɛɾɟi]; 13 August 1925 – 27 December 2015), best known by his shortened name Bik Ndoja (Albanian: [ˈbik ənˈdɔja]), was an Albanian singer, songwriter and actor.

Considered the "nightingale" of the traditional urban music of Shkodër, he was famous for songs such as “S’ma din hallin qi kam”, “Elbarojen ta pata fal”, “Si dukat i vogël je”, “Jare të due”.

== Life and career ==
Bik Ndoja was born in Shkodër, in northern Albania in 1925. He completed studies in Jordan Misja High School in Shkodër.

Ndoja started singing from an early age, later performing in weddings backed by small folk instrumental formations, among them future famous artist Karlo Radoja playing the accordion. Gradually his activity would expand to concerts all over Albania and abroad. He was awarded the title of Artist i merituar (Merited Artist of Albania) in 1969, Krenaria e qytetit (City's Pride) by the municipality of Shkodër in 1999 and Nderi i kombit (Honor of the Nation Decoration) in 2016.

His last artistic activity was in 2014 before his death on 27 December 2015, at the age of 90.
