= Mother Teresa Medal =

Honorary decoration of the Republic of Albania

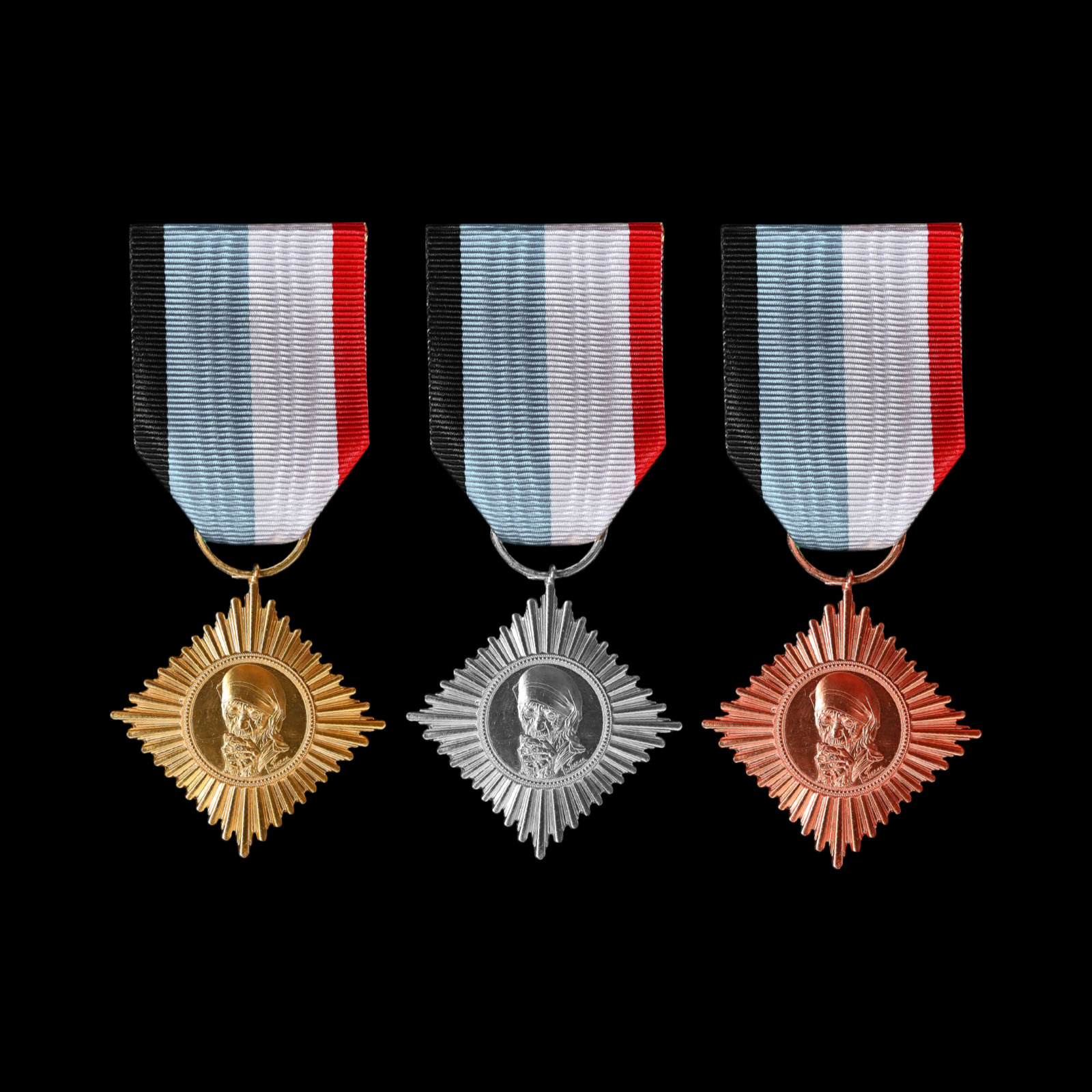
- "Mother Teresa" Medal shown in three classes
- Native name: Medalja "Nënë Tereza"
- Type: State decoration
- Awarded for: Distinguished merit and contributions in charity, medical and social care, voluntary assistance to people in need and the advancement of society and humanistic values
- Country: Albania
- Presented by: President of the Republic
- Eligibility: Albanian and foreign citizens
- Status: Currently constituted
- Established: 30 October 1991
- Ribbon bar

The Mother Teresa Medal (Albanian: Medalja "Nënë Tereza"; MNT) is a state decoration of Albania, awarded for distinguished contributions in the fields of charity, medical and social care, voluntary assistance to people in need and the advancement of society and humanistic values.

Named after Mother Teresa, the decoration is conferred in three grades: gold, silver and bronze.

== History ==
A state decoration named after Mother Teresa was first instituted in 1991 as the "Mother Teresa" Order.

The decoration itself changed legally over time. Law 112/2013 defined the single-grade Dekorata "Nënë Tereza" as awarded for outstanding humanitarian acts, presented by a decorative clasp without a ribbon. Law 93/2022 subsequently replaced it with a three-grade medal, officially known as Medalja “Nënë Tereza”.

== Insignia ==
The medal takes the form of a radiating rhombus, with a circular medallion at its center bearing an image of Mother Teresa. It is then suspended from a white and light-blue ribbon with red and black borders. The colors are in reference to the robes worn by the Missionaries of Charity members, while the red and black borders represent Mother Teresa's Albanian heritage.

== Notable recipients ==
- Zef Margjinaj – Catholic priest
- Marianne Graf – humanitarian and development worker
- Domenick Scaglione – physician and humanitarian
- Pjetër Arbnori – politician and writer
- Queen Geraldine – Queen consort of Albania
- Vincenzo Paglia – Catholic archbishop
- Albanian Caritas – Catholic humanitarian organization
- Mother Teresa University Hospital – university hospital
- Valdas Adamkus – politician and former president of Lithuania
- Stjepan Mesić – politician and former president of Croatia
- Massimo D'Alema – politician and former prime minister of Italy
- Sam Brownback – politician and diplomat
- Al Bano – singer
- Michel Platini – footballer and sports administrator
- Rita Saliu – poet
- Adem Allçi – educator
- Sami Dangëllia – political prisoner
- Cristoforo Palmieri – Catholic bishop
- Lino Nikolai – physician
- Gjin Mark Doda – Catholic priest
- Camilla, Duchess of Castro – philanthropist and member of the House of Bourbon-Two Sicilies
- Princess Marie-Therese von Hohenberg – philanthropist and member of the House of Hohenberg
- Lucjan Avgustini – Catholic bishop
- Emanuele Giordano – Catholic priest
- Sebastian Vazhakala – Catholic priest and missionary
- Dod Doçi – Catholic priest
- Pier Ferdinando Casini – politician
- Angelo Massafra – Catholic archbishop
- Mary Jean Eisenhower – humanitarian
- Theodore R. Britton Jr. – diplomat and businessman
- SOS Children's Villages – international humanitarian organization
- Antonio Bellusci – Catholic priest, writer and ethnographer
- Behgjet Pacolli – businessman and politician
- Hajdar Sulo – poet and writer
- Gëzim Alpion – sociologist and academic
- Anton Nikë Berisha – writer and scholar
- George Anthony Frendo – Catholic archbishop
- Gerond Husi – physician

== See also ==
- Chancellery of Orders and Medals of the Republic
- Orders, decorations, and medals of Albania
- Mother Teresa
- Missionaries of Charity
