= Gjergj Meta =

Albanian Roman Catholic bishop (born 1976)

His Excellency, The Most Reverend Gjergj Meta
- Bishop of Rrëshen
- Church: Catholic Church
- Diocese: Diocese of Rrëshen
- Appointed: 15 June 2017
- Predecessor: Cristoforo Palmieri

Orders
- Ordination: 21 April 2001
- Consecration: 2 September 2017 by George Anthony Frendo

Personal details
- Born: 30 April 1976 (age 50) Durrës, Albania
- Motto: Feja vepron me dashuri
- Coat of arms

Gjergj Meta (born 30 April 1976) is an Albanian Roman Catholic prelate, who has served as bishop of the Diocese of Rrëshen since 2017. He has also served as president of the Episcopal Conference of Albania since 2024.

== Early life and education ==
Meta was born on 30 April 1976 in Durrës, Albania.

In 1994 he entered the episcopal seminary in Bari, Italy, for a preparatory year. From 1995 to 2000 he studied theology at the regional seminary of Molfetta in the Apulia region of Italy. He was ordained a priest on 21 April 2001 for the Archdiocese of Tiranë–Durrës.

He later studied canon law at the Pontifical Gregorian University in Rome, obtaining a licentiate (2006–2009).

== Priestly ministry ==
Following his ordination, Meta served as parish vicar at the co-cathedral of Saint Lucy in Durrës from 2001 to 2002.

From 2002 to 2003 he served as parish vicar at the Cathedral of Saint Paul in Tirana, and from 2003 to 2006 as parish administrator there. During the same period he directed university pastoral ministry in the archdiocese and at national level.

After returning from studies in Rome, he served as parish priest in Kamëz and as administrator of the parishes in Gramzë and Luz.

Meta also served as spokesperson of the Episcopal Conference of Albania from 2009 to 2012 and later became Vicar general of the Archdiocese of Tiranë–Durrës.

== Episcopal ministry ==
On 15 June 2017, Pope Francis appointed Meta bishop of the Diocese of Rrëshen, following the resignation of Cristoforo Palmieri. He received episcopal consecration on 2 September 2017.

Meta was elected secretary general of the Episcopal Conference of Albania in 2018.

In February 2024 he was elected president of the conference.

He has participated in various initiatives promoting interreligious dialogue and cooperation between religious communities in Albania.
