= Martyrs of Albania =

Venerated group of 38 Catholics

Blessed Martyrs of Albania
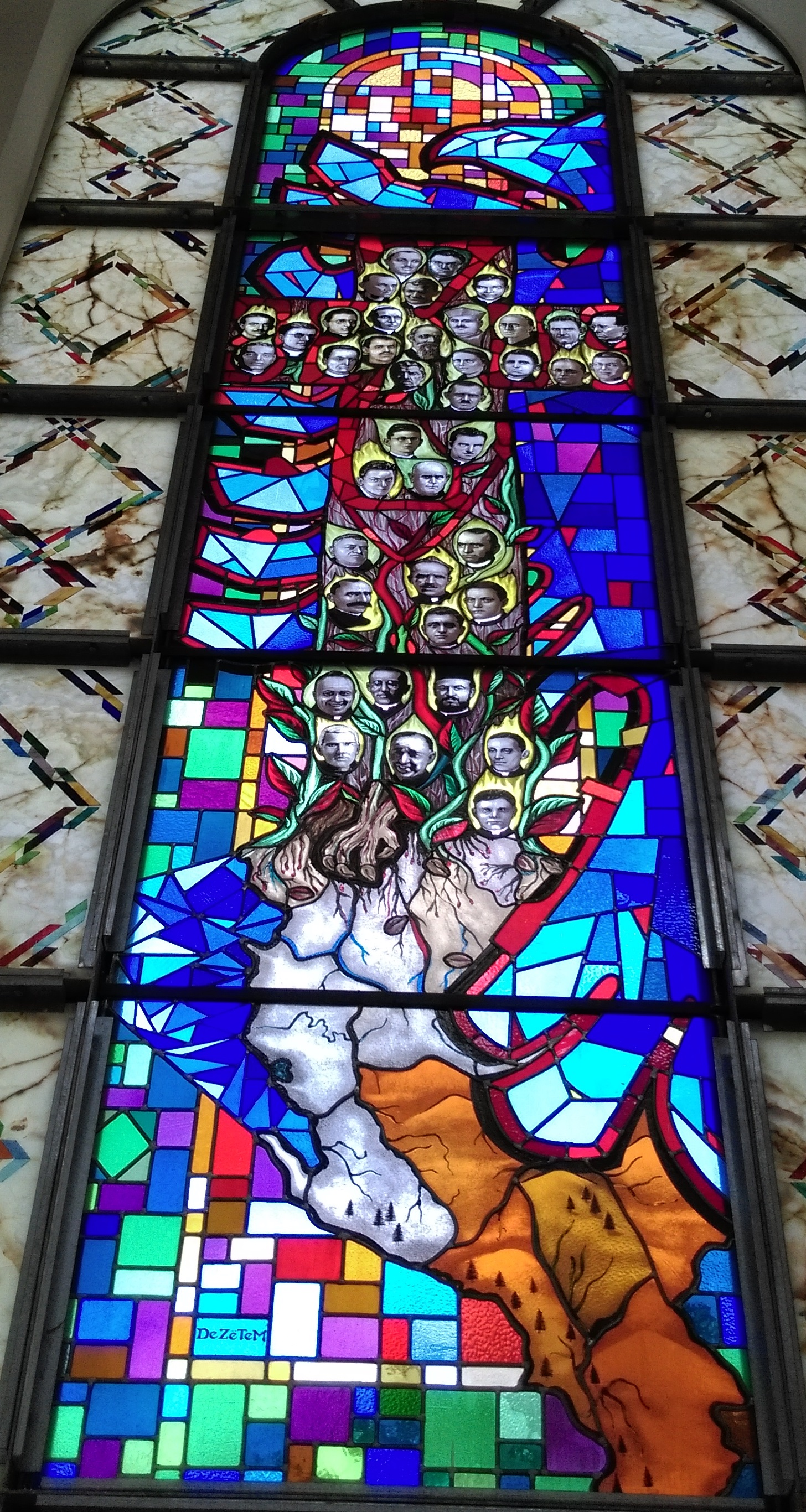
- Martyrs of Albania. Stained glass depiction at the Catholic Cathedral in Pristina

Martyrs
- Born: 1874–1935: Albania; Italy; Poland; Kosovo; Serbia; Germany
- Died: 1945–1974; Albania
- Venerated in: Catholic Church
- Beatified: 5 November 2016, Shkodër Cathedral, Shkodër, Albania by Cardinal Angelo Amato
- Feast: 5 November

The Martyrs of Albania were a collective group of 38 individuals killed during the Communist regime in Albania from 1945 until 1974 (all but five between 1945 and 1950). The government of Albania enforced state atheism. All were born at various times between 1874 and 1935; the group included Albanians and Italians as well as one German. Each of these individuals, apart from four, were part of the religious life as either priests or religious and served as either missionaries or educators with a great deal spending their educational formation in Italian and Austrian cities.

The beatification cause opened in 2002 and the group were beatified on 5 November 2016.

== Life ==
=== Background ===
The People's Socialist Republic of Albania was an atheist state; Article 37 of the Albanian Constitution of 1976 stipulated, "The state recognizes no religion, and supports atheistic propaganda in order to implant a scientific materialistic world outlook in people."

The 38 individuals were all murdered during the Communist regime between the end of World War II in 1945 until 1974 (mostly between 1945 and 1950. They included 2 bishops as well as 21 diocesan priests and 7 from the Order of Friars Minor. There were also 3 Jesuits and 1 seminarian killed in addition to 4 of the general faithful.

There was one single woman killed – she was an aspirant (though no member) to the religious life of the Franciscan Sisters of the Stigmata.

=== Individual biographies ===
==== Giovanni Fausti ====
Giovanni Fausti was born in Brescia as the first of twelve children to Antonio Fausti and Maria Sigolini. At the age of ten he began his ecclesiastical studies and was a classmate of Giovanni Battista Montini – the future Pope Paul VI. He studied at the Pontifical Lombard College in Rome where he was later ordained as a priest on 9 July 1922; he entered the Society of Jesus on 30 October 1924. He was drafted into the armed forces in 1917 and in 1920 attended a course at Modena for this before being sent to service in Rome; he was discharged as a lieutenant in 1920 and resumed his studies. He graduated in theological studies at the Pontifical Gregorian University. In 1923 he served as a philosophical studies educator in Brescia. From 1929 to 1932 he was a professor in Albania and wrote on ecumenism from 1931 to 1933 in the magazine "La Civilta Cattolica".

In Albania he coordinated careful dialogue with the Islamic religion and was later recalled to Mantua in 1932 where he contracted tuberculosis. Fausti underwent special health treatments in Switzerland from August 1933 to 1936 as well as in northern Italian cities before making his profession on 2 February 1936. He returned to Albania to continue his work in 1942 and in Tirana in World War II suffered a broken collarbone due to a Nazi bullet that struck him. Fausti was arrested on 31 December 1945 and was held in confinement for two months where he was tortured; he was sentenced on 22 February 1946. Fausti was shot dead at 6:00am on 4 March 1946.

==== Daniel Dajani ====
Daniel Dajani was born in late 1906. In 1918 he started his studies for the priesthood and began his novitiate period with the Society of Jesus at Gorizia on 8 July 1926. He underwent his philosophical studied in Chieri from 1931 to 1933 and taught from 1934 to 1935 before returning for theological studies in Chieri from 1937 to 1939 just prior to the start of World War II. He returned to teaching in 1940 and on 2 February 1942 made his solemn profession.

He was arrested on 31 December 1945 – sent to solitary confinement for two months and tortured – and later sentenced to death on 22 February 1946; he was shot dead at 6:00am on 4 March 1946.

==== Lek Sirdani ====
Lek Sirdani was born on 1 March 1891; his brother Marin became a member of the Order of Friars Minor. His parents died sometime during his childhood. An aunt first educated him and an Albanian Muslim then took charge over his education. Sirdani was ordained in 1916 in Austria after having studied there and he soon returned to Albania.

Sirdani delivered a homily on 26 July 1948 alluding to Communist activities in Albania and was arrested on 27 July before being tortured on 29 July and thrown into a large room that was the cesspool of all inmate bathrooms; he died of suffocation there.

==== Maria Tuci ====
Maria Tuci was born in 1928 to Nikoll Mark Tuci and Dila Fusha and attended school that the Franciscan Sisters of the Stigmata managed; she also asked to become part of their order but this never happened. She – in 1946 – began work with her friend Davida Markagjoni as a teacher and she often paid for supplies herself for the benefit of the children under her ward. She often walked six or seven kilometers to get to Mass.

Tucci was arrested on 10 August 1949 and was tortured to the point where she was admitted into the civil hospital where she later succumbed to her injuries just two months later. Her last words were: "I thank God that I die free". Her torture had intensified after she refused to answer her captors' questions.

==== Luigj Prendushi ====
Luigj Prendushi was born in 1896 and was ordained as a priest in 1921 in Italy; he had departed for that place at age twelve. He returned to Albania in 1921 after his ordination and the ship that carried him sank; he was known at the time for being calm in the face of this trouble. Prendushi was arrested on 5 December 1946 and shot dead in 1947.

==== Gjon Pantalla ====
Gjon Pantalla was born on 2 June 1887 in Kosovo and entered the Jesuits as a professed religious rather than as a priest as his superiors would have liked him to have become. He spent time in Italy for his education and did his novitiate in Soresina. Pantalla was arrested and tried to escape his captors when he jumped out of a window – he broke his legs and was recaptured and later died of his injuries on 31 October 1947.

==== Kolë Shllaku ====
Kolë Shllaku – Gjon in religious – was born in 1907. He became part of the Franciscans and was later ordained as a priest in 1931 in Belgium. He made his solemn profession as a Franciscan at the age of fifteen and returned to Albania. He was arrested and sentenced to death by firing squad on 22 February 1946; he was shot to death at 6:00am on 4 March 1946.

==== Gjon Koda ====
Gjon Koda – Serafin in religious – was born on 25 April 1893 in Serbia and became a professed member of the Order of Friars Minor. He was ordained in 1925 and celebrated his first Mass on 30 July 1925. Koda was arrested by the Communist regime and tortured for two weeks.

==== Lazër Shantoja ====
Lazër Shantoja was born on 2 September 1892. An uncle of his led his life to the extent that Shantoja wanted to become a priest. He spent time in Switzerland in exile during the government of Zog I of Albania and returned after a good period of fifteen years. The Jesuits oversaw his education and he continued his studies in Innsbruck in Austria where he learned German; he was ordained as a priest in 1920 and could play the piano.

The authorities broke his arms and legs during his torture and he had to drag himself on his elbows and knees in order to move since the damage was too great; he was killed in 1945 with a gunshot to the neck.

==== Josif Mihali ====
Josif Mihali (or Papamihali) was born on 23 September 1912 as part of the Italo-Albanian Catholic Church and he was dispatched to Grottaferrata and Rome. He studied for the priesthood in Rome and celebrated the Divine Liturgy – or first Mass – on 1 December 1935 at the church of Saint Athanasius in Rome. Mihali returned to Albania in 1936.

Mihali was arrested in 1945 and sentenced to a decade of hard labor in the marshes. On 26 October 1948 – while working – he collapsed from tiredness and the guards forced other workers to bury him alive; he died of suffocation.

==== Dedë Nikacj ====
Dedë Nikacj – Ciprian in religious – was born in 1900 and became part of the Order of Friars Minor. Nikacj was orphaned by age five and educated by the Franciscans; he was sent to study theology in Austria before being ordained as a priest in Rome in 1924. He was arrested on the charge of concealing a weapons cache behind a church altar and was tortured until being shot to death on 11 March 1948.

==== Pal Prennushi ====
Pal Prennushi – Mati in religious – was born on 2 October 1881 and received his education from the Franciscans; he served as their provincial father – since becoming one – from 1943 until 1946. He studied in Austria where he was later ordained as a priest in 1904 before the Serbs arrested him in 1911 for political activism – an Albanian Franciscan secured his release even though he had been sentenced to death. Communist authorities arrested him in September 1946 and tortured him for six months.

He was shot to death on 11 March 1948.

== Individuals ==
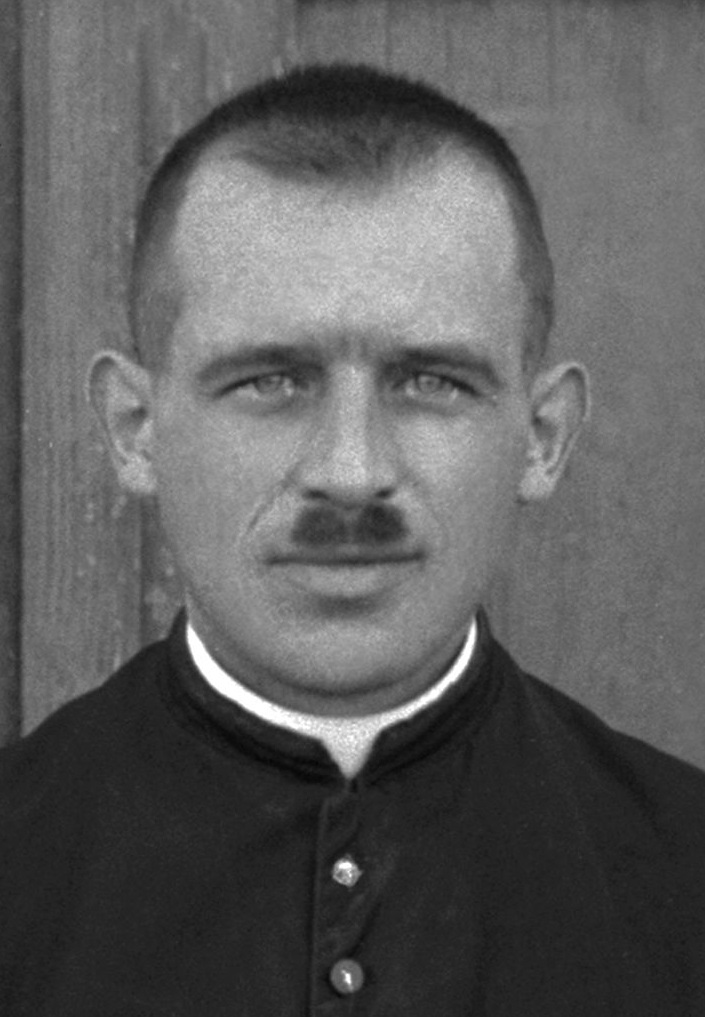
Alfons Tracki c. 1930

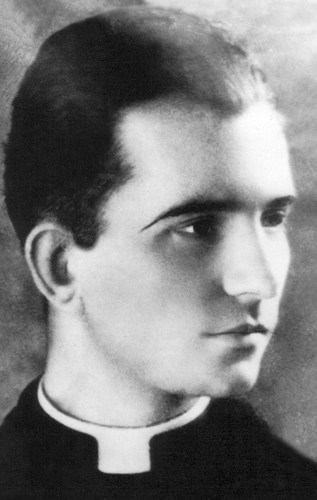
Anton Muzaj

The individuals are:

- Alfons Tracki (2 December 1896 – 18 July 1946) – priest
- Anton Muzaj (12 May 1921 – 4 March 1948) – priest
- Anton Zogaj (26 July 1908 – 31 December 1946) – priest
- Bernardin (Zef) Palaj (2 October 1894 – 2 December 1947) – priest of the Order of Friars Minor
- Çiprian (Dedë) Nika (19 July 1900 – 11 March 1948) – priest of the Order of Friars Minor
- Daniel Dajani (2 December 1906 – 4 March 1946) – Jesuit priest
- Dedë Malaj (16 November 1917 – 12 May 1959) – priest
- Dedë Plani (21 January 1891 – 30 April 1948) – priest
- Dedë Maçaj (5 February 1920 – 28 March 1947) – priest
- Ejëll Deda (22 February 1917 – 12 May 1948) – priest
- Fran Mirakaj (1917 – September 1946) – married layman
- Frano Gjini (20 February 1886 – 11 March 1948) – bishop
- Gaspër Suma (23 March 1897 – 16 April 1950) – priest of the Order of Friars Minor
- Giovanni Fausti (19 October 1899 – 4 March 1946) – Italian Jesuit priest
- Gjelosh Lulashi (2 September 1925 – 4 March 1946) – layman
- Gjon Pantalla (2 June 1887 – 31 October 1947) – Jesuit religious
- Gjon Shllaku (27 July 1907 – 4 March 1946) – priest of the Order of Friars Minor
- Jak Bushati (8 August 1890 – 12 February 1949) – priest
- Josef Marxen (5 August 1906 – 16 November 1946) – German priest
- Josif Mihali (23 September 1912 – 26 October 1948) – Albanian Greek Catholic priest
- Jul Bonati (24 May 1874 – 5 November 1951) – priest
- Karl Serreqi (26 February 1911 – 4 April 1954) – priest of the Order of Friars Minor
- Lazër Shantoja (2 September 1892 – 5 March 1945) – priest
- Lek Sirdani (1 March 1891 – 29 July 1948) – priest
- Luigj Prendushi (24 January 1896 – 24 January 1947) – priest
- Maria Tuci (12 April 1928 – 24 October 1950) – laywoman
- Marin Shkurti (1 October 1933 – April 1969) – priest
- Mark Çuni (30 September 1919 – 4 March 1946) – Seminarian
- Mark Xhani (10 July 1914 – 1947) – priest
- Mati (Pal) Prennushi (2 October 1881 – 11 March 1948) – priest of the Order of Friars Minor
- Mikel Beltoja (9 May 1935 – 10 February 1974) – priest
- Ndoc Suma (31 July 1887 – 22 April 1958) – priest
- Ndre Zadeja (3 November 1891 – 25 March 1945) – priest
- Pjetër Çuni (9 July 1914 – 29 July 1948) – priest
- Qerim Sadiku (18 February 1919 – 4 March 1946) – layman
- Serafin Koda (25 April 1893 – 11 May 1947) – priest of the Order of Friars Minor
- Shtjefën Kurti (24 December 1898 – 20 October 1971) – Kosovo Albanian priest
- Vinçenc Prennushi (4 September 1885 – 20 March 1949) – archbishop of the Order of Friars Minor

== Beatification ==
The beatification cause started with the transfer of competent forum to one Albanian diocese on 7 June 2002 before the formal introduction under Pope John Paul II in which the Congregation for the Causes of Saints issued the official "nihil obstat" and titled them all as Servants of God; the diocesan process opened on 10 November 2002 and Cardinal Claudio Hummes closed it on 8 December 2010. The C.C.S validated the process on 9 March 2012 before receiving two volumes that was the Positio in 2015 from the postulation.

Theologians approved the cause on 17 December 2015 as did the C.C.S. on 19 April 2016. Pope Francis confirmed the beatification on 26 April 2016 and Cardinal Angelo Amato presided over the beatification on 5 November 2016 in Albania on the pope's behalf. 10 000 people attended as did five cardinals and the Archbishop of Potenza. The cardinal-designate Ernest Simoni was also present.

The current postulator for this cause is Giovangiuseppe Califano.
