= Church of Our Lady of Shkodra =

Catholic church in Hartsdale, New York

- Church of Our Lady of Shkodra
- 41°1′40″N 73°48′26″W
- Location: Hartsdale, New York
- Denomination: Catholic Church
- Website: albchurch.org

History
- Status: Parish church
- Founded: 20 February 1987
- Dedicated: 25 April 1999

Architecture
- Completed: 1998

Administration
- Archdiocese: Archdiocese of New York

The Church of Our Lady of Shkodra (Albanian: Kisha Katolike Zoja e Shkodrës) is an Albanian Roman Catholic church located in Hartsdale, New York.

== History ==
The origins of the Albanian Catholic Church in New York start with the establishment of the Albanian-American Catholic League on 16 June 1962. In 1969, the League acquired a center on 4221 Park Avenue, Bronx, and renamed itself to the Our Lady of Good Counsel Albanian Catholic Center. The first mass was held on Christmas of 1969, while the church was officially opened on 12 April 1970, and on 19 August 1973, it was dedicated by cardinal Terence Cooke.

On 20 February 1987, with the approval of Archdiocese of New York, the two Albanian Catholic Centers "Our Lady of Good Counsel" and "St. Paul and St. Peter" were merged into Albanian Catholic Church of Our Lady of Shkodra. On 28 September 1989, cardinal John O'Connor established the first Albanian Catholic parish in the United States, and named Rrok Mirdita as the first pastor.

The construction of the church building started on 3 December 1995, and the first mass was held on the Christmas of 1998. On 25 April 1999, on the Fest of Our Lady of Shkodra, the Church of Our Lady of Shkodra was consecrated by John O'Connor, Archbishop of New York.

Pastors have included Rrok Mirdita (1989–1993)

== See also ==
- List of churches in the Roman Catholic Archdiocese of New York
