= Geraldine of Albania =

Queen of the Albanians from 1938 to 1939

Geraldine
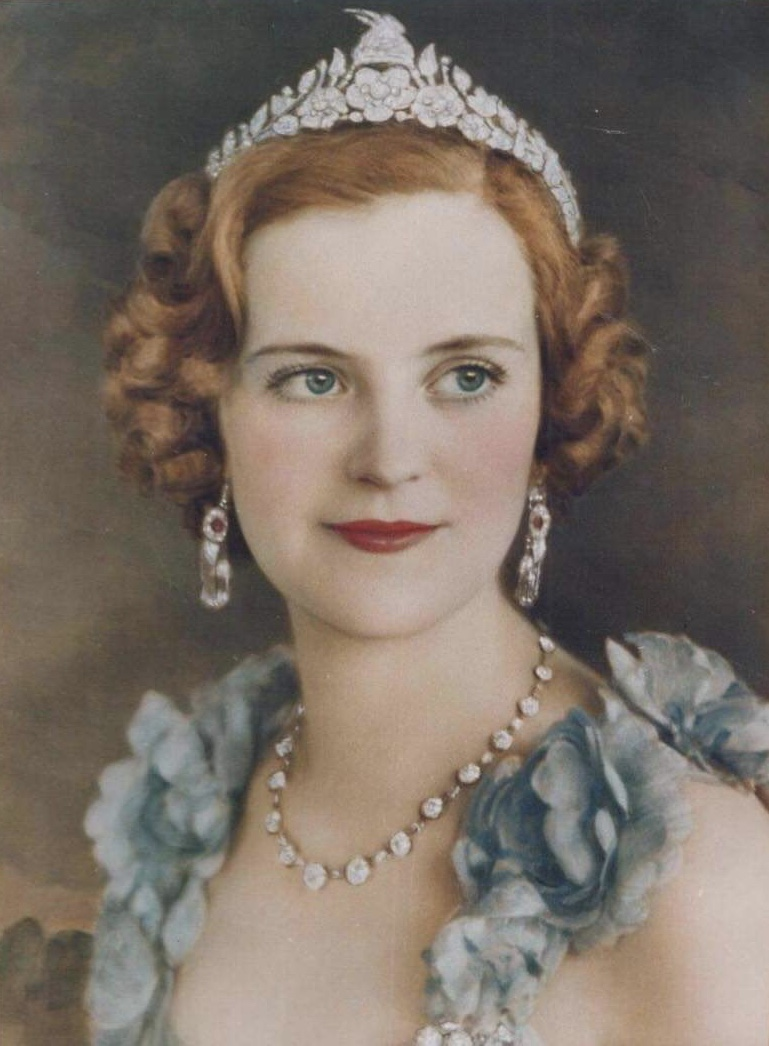

Queen consort of the Albanians
- Tenure: 27 April 1938 – 7 April 1939
- Born: Countess Géraldine Margit Virginia Olga Mária Apponyi de Nagy-Appony; 6 August 1915; Budapest, Kingdom of Hungary, Austria-Hungary
- Died: 22 October 2002 (aged 87); Tirana, Republic of Albania
- Burial: 26 October 2002; Mausoleum of the Albanian Royal Family
- Spouse: Zog I of Albania (m. 1938; died 1961)
- Issue: Leka, Crown Prince of Albania
- House: Apponyi
- Father: Count Gyula Apponyi de Nagy-Apponyi
- Mother: Gladys Virginia Stewart
- Religion: Catholic

Geraldine of Albania (born Countess Géraldine Margit Virginia Olga Mária Apponyi de Nagy-Appony; 6 August 1915 – 22 October 2002) was Queen of the Albanians from her marriage to King Zog I on 27 April 1938 until King Zog was deposed on 7 April of the following year.

Geraldine was born in Austria-Hungary into the noble Apponyi family. Her family fled to Switzerland in 1918, when the monarchy of Austria-Hungary was abolished. They returned to Hungary in 1921. However, after her father Gyula died in 1924, her American-born mother Gladys took Geraldine and her two siblings to live in Southern France. Later, Geraldine was educated at a boarding school in Austria. She met King Zog in 1938, and they married shortly afterwards.

The Italian invasion of Albania cut short Zog's reign. During World War II, Zog and Geraldine lived first in France and later in England. Later on, they would live in France again and in Egypt. After her husband died in Paris in 1961, Geraldine took the title Queen Mother and asserted the rights of her son Leka, Crown Prince of Albania, to rule. She and Leka fled successively to Spain, Rhodesia, and South Africa. Geraldine was allowed to return to Albania in 2002, and she died that year aged 87.

== Early life ==
Geraldine was born in Budapest, Austria-Hungary, a daughter of Count Gyula Apponyi de Nagy-Appony (1873–1924), Grand Marshal of the Hungarian Court, of the old and noble Apponyi family which had been great landowners in Upper Hungary since the 13th century. Her mother was Gladys Virginia Stewart (1891–1947), an American, daughter of John Henry Stewart, a diplomat who served as US Consul in Antwerp, Belgium, and his wife Mary Virginia Ramsay Harding (later Mrs. Gustaf Stråle af Ekna), who both came from monied families of the New World, specifically Virginia, Maryland and North Carolina. Her parents married on 29 July 1914, at St. Joseph's Church in Geneva, Switzerland.

When Geraldine was three, the Empire of Austria-Hungary collapsed, and the Apponyi family went to live in Switzerland. In 1921, they returned to the Kingdom of Hungary which was stable under Regent Miklós Horthy. However, when Geraldine's father died in 1924, her mother and their three children (Geraldine, now nine, Virginia, and Gyula) went to live in the resort of Menton, in the south of France. When the Countess married a French officer, her Hungarian in-laws insisted that the children be returned to Hungary for their schooling. The girls were sent to the Sacred Heart boarding school in Pressbaum, near Vienna. Geraldine's happy childhood then continued at the chateau Oponice (Appony), the Apponyi family's ancestral possessions, in present-day Slovakia; at the time, it was part of Czechoslovakia, whose citizenship Geraldine gained, and she lived there until 1938. Her family's fortune spent, Geraldine earned a living as a shorthand typist. She also worked in the gift shop of the Budapest National Museum, where her uncle was the director.

== Royal life ==
Geraldine was introduced on New Year’s Day 1938 to King Zog I of the Albanians, who had seen a photograph of her. She visited the Albanian Kingdom and within days the couple were engaged to be married. Known as the "White Rose of Hungary", Geraldine was raised to royal status as Princess Geraldine of Albania prior to her wedding.

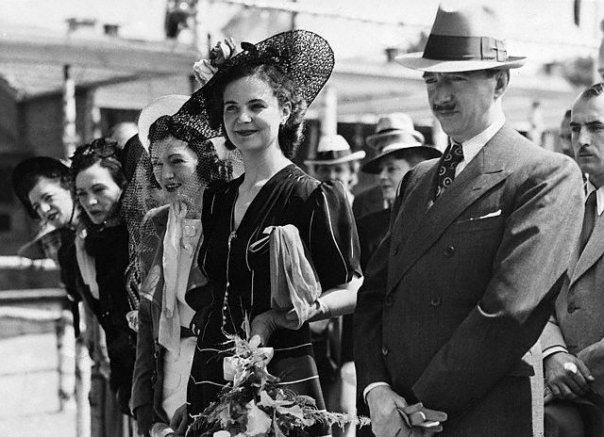
Queen Geraldine pictured with King Zog and his sisters in exile in Sweden

On 27 April 1938, in Tirana, Albania, Geraldine married the King in a ceremony witnessed by Galeazzo Ciano, envoy and son-in-law of Il Duce and Prime Minister of Italy, Benito Mussolini. She was Roman Catholic and King Zog was Muslim. Geraldine wore a new diamond tiara, specially commissioned from Austrian jewellers, featuring the motifs of the white rose for the bride, and the heraldic goat for the groom. They drove to their honeymoon in an open-top scarlet Mercedes-Benz 540K, a present from Adolf Hitler.

The couple had one son, Crown Prince Leka Zogu (1939–2011).

Zog's rule was cut short by the Italian invasion of Albania in April 1939, and the family fled the country into exile. From April 1939, Geraldine and Zog fled Albania via Greece and Turkey and settled in France, and then in England. They lived in the Ritz Hotel, London, at Ascot and, for most of the war, at Parmoor House, Frieth, Buckinghamshire, England. In 1946, they went to Egypt, and then in 1952 to France. King Zog I died in Hauts-de-Seine, France, in 1961 and their son, Crown Prince Leka, was proclaimed King Leka I by the royalist government in exile on April 5. Following this, the royal family moved to Spain, Saudi Arabia, Rhodesia and then South Africa.

== Later life ==
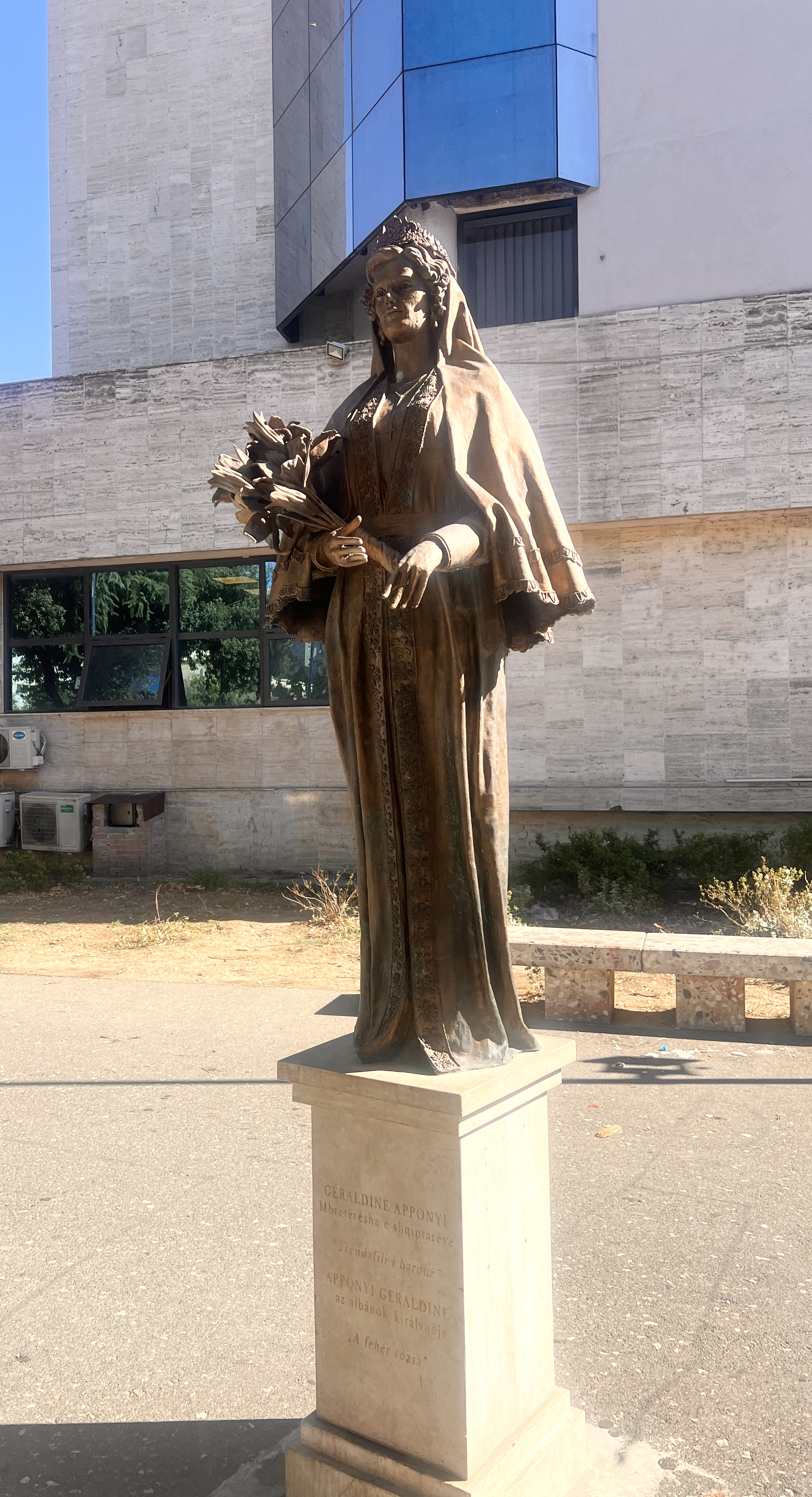
Statue of Queen Geraldine in Tirana.

After her husband's death, Geraldine preferred to be known as the "Queen Mother of Albania". In 2001, Geraldine returned from South Africa to live in Albania, after the law was changed to allow her to do so. She continued to assert that her son Leka was the legitimate King of the Albanians.

Queen Geraldine of the Albanians died five months later at the age of 87 in a military hospital in Tirana. After being admitted for treatment for lung disease, she suffered at least three heart attacks, the last of which was fatal, on 22 October 2002. She was buried by the Central House of the Army with full honors, including a funeral oration at St Paul's Cathedral, on 26 October 2002, and interred in the Sharra cemetery, Albania, in the "VIP plot". She was later reburied in the Royal Mausoleum in Tirana.

On 5 April 2004 her grandson, Leka, Crown Prince of Albania, accepted the Mother Teresa Medal awarded to her posthumously by the Albanian government in recognition of her charitable efforts for the people of Albania. Leka's daughter Geraldine (born 22 October 2020 at Queen Geraldine Maternity Hospital in Tirana, on the 18th death anniversary of Queen Geraldine) was named in her honor.

On 1 February 2022, a statue of Queen Geraldine was inaugurated in Tirana. Designed by sculptor Sándor Kligl, the statue was donated to the City of Tirana by the Hungarian Embassy.

== Honors ==
- Knight Grand Cross of the Order of Fidelity (26 April 1938).
- Mother Teresa Medal [posthumous] (5 April 2004).

Geraldine of Albania House of Apponyi Born: 6 August 1915 Died: 22 October 2002
Albanian royalty
Vacant Title last held by Princess Sophie of Schönburg-Waldenburg as Princess of Albania	Queen consort of the Albanians; 27 April 1938 – 7 April 1939	Succeeded by Princess Elena of Montenegro as Queen of Italy
