= Cathedral of Tirana =

The term Cathedral of Tirana may refer to:

- St. Paul's Cathedral, Tirana
- Resurrection Cathedral, Tirana
