= Cristoforo Palmieri =

Italian-born Albanian Roman Catholic bishop (born 1939)

The Most Reverend Cristoforo Palmieri CM
- Bishop emeritus of Rrëshen
- Church: Catholic Church
- Province: Tiranë-Durrës
- Diocese: Rrëshen
- Installed: 23 November 2005
- Term ended: 15 June 2017
- Predecessor: Angelo Massafra
- Successor: Gjergj Meta

Orders
- Ordination: 18 March 1967
- Consecration: 28 December 2005 by Rrok Kola Mirdita

Personal details
- Born: Cristoforo Palmieri; 24 May 1939 (age 87) Bitonto, Kingdom of Italy
- Motto: Christus pax nostra

Cristoforo Palmieri CM (born 24 May 1939) is an Italian-born Albanian Roman Catholic prelate who served as the Bishop of the Diocese of Rrëshen in Albania from 2005 to 2017. A member of the Congregation of the Mission (Vincentians), he previously served as the Apostolic Administrator of the same diocese from 2000 until 2005.

== Biography ==
=== Early life and ministry ===
Palmieri was born in Bitonto, in the Province of Bari, Italy. He joined the Congregation of the Mission and was ordained a priest on 18 March 1967. Following the fall of the communist regime in Albania, Palmieri was sent to the country in the early 1990s to assist in the reconstruction of the local church, and soon he was appointed a Vicar General (1996–1998) and a Diocesan Administrator (1998–2000) for the Diocese of Rrëshen. On 6 March 2000, Pope John Paul II appointed him Apostolic Administrator of Rrëshen.

=== Episcopal ministry ===
On 23 November 2005, Pope Benedict XVI elevated him to the rank of Bishop of Rrëshen. He received his episcopal consecration on 28 December 2005 from Archbishop Rrok Kola Mirdita, with Archbishops John Bulaitis and Angelo Massafra serving as co-consecrators. During his tenure, he was known for his missionary work and efforts in the social development of the region, which had been historically impoverished.

=== Retirement and later years ===
Upon reaching the mandatory retirement age of 75, he submitted his resignation. Pope Francis accepted it on 15 June 2017, appointing Gjergj Meta as his successor. After his retirement, Palmieri returned to Italy, residing in Lecce, where he continued to assist in local pastoral work. In May 2019, he celebrated his 80th birthday with the community in Lecce. He suffered a temporary health scare in November 2021 but recovered shortly thereafter.
