= Vinçenc Prennushi =

Albanian Catholic priest and poet (1885–1949)

Blessed Vinçenc Prennushi O.F.M.
- Archbishop of Durrës
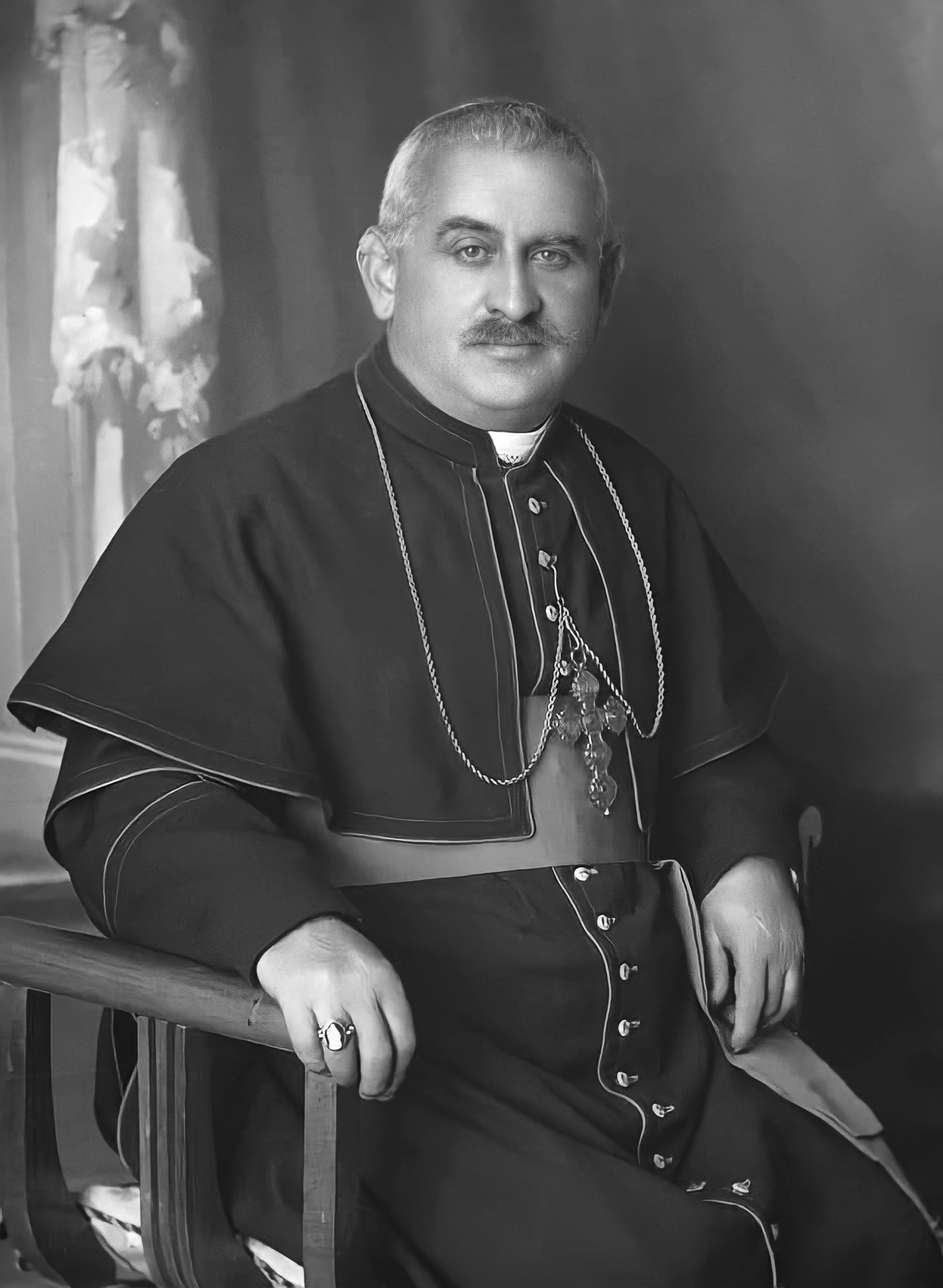
- Prennushi photographed by Kel Marubi (1936).
- Church: Roman Catholic Church
- Archdiocese: Durrës
- See: Durrës
- Appointed: 26 June 1940
- Term ended: 19 March 1949
- Predecessor: Pjetër Gjura
- Successor: Rrok Mirdita
- Previous post: Bishop of Sapë (1936–1940)

Orders
- Ordination: 19 March 1908
- Consecration: 19 March 1936 by Giovanni Battista della Pietra

Personal details
- Born: Nikoll Prendushi; 4 September 1885 Shkodër, Ottoman Empire
- Died: 19 March 1949 (aged 63) Durrës, Albania

Sainthood
- Feast day: 5 November
- Venerated in: Roman Catholic Church
- Beatified: 5 November 2016; Shkodër Cathedral, Albania by Cardinal Angelo Amato
- Attributes: Episcopal attire
- Patronage: Persecuted Christians

Vinçenc Prennushi (born Nikoll Prendushi, 4 September 1885 – 19 March 1949) was an Albanian Roman Catholic professed member from the Order of Friars Minor and he served as the Archbishop of Durrës from 1940 until his death. Prennushi became a noted poet and writer and published several works on national and international matters.

Prennushi – and other companions killed under the communist regime – was beatified on 5 November 2016 and Cardinal Angelo Amato presided over the celebration on the behalf of Pope Francis.

== Life ==
Nikoll Prennushi was born in Shkodër on 4 September 1885 to Gjon and Drande Prennushi.

Prennushi entered the Order of Friars Minor in 1900 and commenced his novitiate period in Troshan while also pursuing his philosophical and theological studies at the Innsbruck college. He assumed the religious name "Vinçenc" when he made his profession into the Franciscans. He was ordained to the priesthood on 19 March 1908 and celebrated his first Mass on the following 25 March. After the establishment of the Albanian state in 1914 he took an active role in the life of his nation and wrote numerous books on national and international affairs and also wrote for and directed newspapers and journals. Prennushi was also a poet and was active in collecting Albanian folklore. On January 27, 1936, Pope Pius XI named him Bishop of Sapë and he received his episcopal consecration the following March 19. On 26 June 1940, he was named Archbishop of Durrës. He began to publish his letters to the faithful in printed form under the fascist occupation in 1941.

In 1945 the communist dictator Enver Hoxha summoned Bishop Prennushi and Bishop Gaspër Thaçi and demanded that the pair separate the nation's churches from Rome and found a new national church. The prelates refused. On May 19, 1947 the communist authorities arrested Prennushi and sentenced him to two decades of imprisonment after his trial on 18 December 1947 and sentencing on 28 February 1948. His cellmate was Arshi Pipa, who later wrote a reminiscence of his final moments. After various forms of torture—including being rolled inside a nail-studded barrel—Prennushi died in prison on March 19, 1949.

== Beatification ==
The beatification process for Prennushi and other companions killed under communist rule took its first step on 7 June 2002 after all causes for each individual were transferred from various dioceses to that of Shkodër-Pult while Prennushi was made the lead individual for the cause. The candidates – including Prennushi – were all titled to be a Servant of God on 4 September 2002 under Pope John Paul II after the Congregation for the Causes of Saints issued the official "nihil obstat" to the cause. The diocesan process spanned from 10 November 2002 until 8 December 2010 and it received C.C.S. validation on 9 March 2012.

The postulation sent the official Positio dossier to the C.C.S. in Rome in 2015 which allowed for theologians to review the cause and approve it on 17 December 2015 while the C.C.S. did so as well on 19 April 2016. Pope Francis approved that the 38 individuals were killed "in odium fidei" (in hatred of the faith) and thus approved their beatification on 26 April 2016. The beatification was celebrated in Albania on 5 November 2016 and Cardinal Angelo Amato presided on the pope's behalf. Up to 20 000 people attended the celebration including the Archbishop of Potenza and the cardinal-elect Ernest Simoni (he held a box of bones of ten of the individuals).

The current postulator for this cause is Giovangiuseppe Califano.

== Published works ==
- 1911: Visari kombëtar (The national treasure)
- 1919: E Trathtuemja (The betrayed)
- Prej robnije në liri (Out of slavery into freedom)
- Gjeth e lule (Trees and flowers)

== See also ==
- Martyrs of Albania
- Religion in Albania
- State atheism
