= Alfons Tracki =

Albanian Catholic priest and martyr

Blessed Alfons Tracki
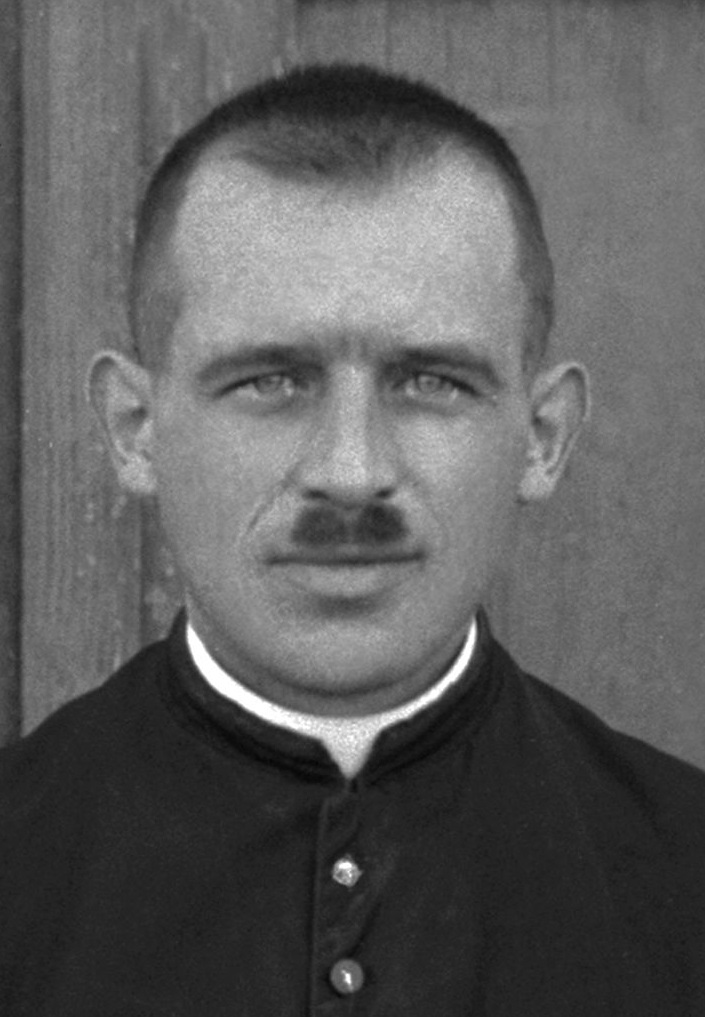
- Alfons Tracki in 1930

Martyr
- Born: 2 December 1896; Bleischwitz, German Empire
- Died: 18 July 1946 (aged 49); Shkodër, Albania
- Venerated in: Roman Catholic Church
- Beatified: 5 November 2016, Saint Stephen's Cathedral, Shkodër, Albania by Angelo Cardinal Amato
- Feast: 18 July

Alfons Tracki (2 December 1896 – 18 July 1946) was an Albanian Catholic priest of German origin, who died as a martyr as a result of the religious persecution by the regime of Enver Hoxha in communist Albania.

== Life and martyrdom ==
Tracki was born in Bleischwitz, German Empire (now Poland) on 2 December 1896, born to Josef Tracki and Martha (née Schramm), of mixed Polish-German ancestry. Alfons grew up in a village in Upper Silesia. When he attended school, he had contact with the Christian School Brothers. He requested to be admitted to the community at their provincial school in Vienna at age 14. He was accepted, and after a novitiate of two years became a member on 16 August 1913, with the religious name Gebhard. He was sent to Albania before World War I and taught at the Xaverian College in Shkodër. With the outbreak of the war, he returned to his home village. He served in the military for two years. He also completed his vows during the war. After the war, he returned to Shkodër, where he studied philosophy and theology. He was ordained as a priest on 14 June 1925 by Lazër Mjeda, the archbishop there. He exercised his ministry in Northern Albania, teaching in the schools and organizing sports for the youth.

Tracki became chaplain at the St Stephen's Cathedral in Shkodër. He founded a Catholic youth organisation, Viribus unitis ("With joined powers"). After his time as chaplain, he became the parish priest of Velipoja. Tracki is remembered, in Zef Pllumi's memoirs Live to tell, as a good priest and crucial in the upbringing of other priests, such as would-be martyr Ejëll Deda. Further, he was heavily involved in the eradication of the Gjakmarrja (Northern Albanian blood feuds), by offering a Christian solution of peace to them.

Communist partisans under Enver Hoxha fought against the Italian and German occupying forces. After the Albanian Communist Party came to power, conspirators with the former rulers were prosecuted, which included Catholics in general. Pjetër Arbnori wrote that Tracki joined a group of anti-communist Freischärler in the mountains. When Tracki administered the Extreme Unction to a fatally wounded soldier, he was arrested. He was in a prison in Shkodër from 13 February 1946, and was sentenced to death on 17 July for performing an illegal priestly act. (Note: According to Arbnori, the charges were: preparation of an Austrian occupation of Albania, founding of a pro-fascist association, and recruitment of a person for the Gestapo.) He was executed on 18 July 1946. According to witnesses, his last words were: "... I do not regret dying, as long as I'm dying together with my brothers, and I have contributed, as much as they have, for your own good, and for the religion of Christ."

Beatified on 5 November 2016 with the other martyrs of Albania, Tracki is venerated as a martyr by the Catholic Church and commemorated with the other martyrs of Albania on 18 July, the date of his execution.

== Literature ==
- Pjetër Arbënori (1998), "Erinnerungen an den deutschen Priester Alfons Tracky", in Werner Daum, Staatliches Museum für Völkerkunde München (ed.), Albanien. Zwischen Kreuz und Halbmond (in German), München/Innsbruck: Pinguin, pp. 167–171, ISBN 3-7016-2461-5

== External links and other literature ==
- (in Albanian) Alfons Tracki, sur kishakatolikeshkoder.com (last seen 5 December 2016).
- (in German) Seligsprechung zweier deutscher in Albanien ermordeter Priester, on de.zenit.org of 29 April 2016 (last seen 5 December 2016).
- Pjetër Arbnori (1998). Penguin (ed.). Erinnerungen an den deutschen Priester Alfons Tracky. Staatliches Museum für Völkerkunde. pp. 167–171. ISBN 3-7016-2461-5.
- Helmut Moll (ed. for Deutsche Bischofskonferenz), Zeugen für Christus. Das deutsche Martyrologium des 20. Jahrhunderts, edition 6, revised and newly structured, Paderborn u. a. 2015, ISBN 978-3-506-78080-5, Band II, S. 1186–1189.
- Helmut Moll: Märtyrer-Pfarrer Alfons Tracki aus Oberschlesien (1896–1946) wird seliggesprochen. In: Schlesische Nachrichten 20/2008, p. 7
