= Diocese of Rrëshen =

Roman Catholic diocese in Albania

Coordinates: 41.7687°N 19.8772°E

Diocese of Rrëshen Dioecesis Rrësheniensis Dioqeza e Rrëshenit

Catholic
- Coat of arms

Location
- Country: Albania
- Metropolitan: Tiranë–Durrës

Statistics
- Area: 4,000 km^{2} (1,500 sq mi)
- Population: Total; Catholics: (as of 2014); 241,000; 55,300 (22.9%)

Information
- Sui iuris church: Latin Church
- Rite: Latin Rite
- Established: 7 December 1996
- Cathedral: Cathedral of Jesus Saviour of the World

Current leadership
- Pope: Leo XIV
- Bishop: Gjergj Meta
- Metropolitan Archbishop: George Anthony Frendo
- Bishops emeritus: Cristoforo Palmieri

Map
- Diocese of Rrëshen

The Diocese of Rrëshen (Latin: Dioecesis Rrësheniensis) is a Latin Church diocese of the Catholic Church located in the city of Rrëshen in the ecclesiastical province of Tiranë–Durrës in Albania.

== History ==
- December 25, 1888: Established as Territorial Abbacy of Shën Llezhri i Oroshit (St. Alexander Orosci)
- December 7, 1996: Promoted as Diocese of Rrëshen

== Ordinaries ==
- Territorial Abbots of Shën Llezhri i Oroshit
  - Abbot Primo Dochi (1888.12.29 – 1919)
  - Bishop Joseph Gionali (1921.08.28 – 1928.06.13)
  - Bishop Francesco Gjini (1930.06.29 – 1946.01.04)
- Bishops of Rrëshen
  - Bishop Angelo Massafra, O.F.M. (1996.12.07 – 1998.03.28, became Metropolitan Archbishop of Shkodre-Pult)
    - Fr. Cristoforo Palmieri, C.M., Apostolic Administrator (2000.03.06 – 2005.11.23)
  - Bishop Cristoforo Palmieri, C.M. (2005.11.23 – 2017.06.15, Retired)
  - Bishop Gjergj Meta (2017.06.15- Present)

== See also ==
- Roman Catholicism in Albania

== Sources and External Links ==
- GCatholic.org
- Catholic Hierarchy
