= Shtjefën Kurti =

Albanian Roman Catholic priest

Blessed Shtjefën Kurti
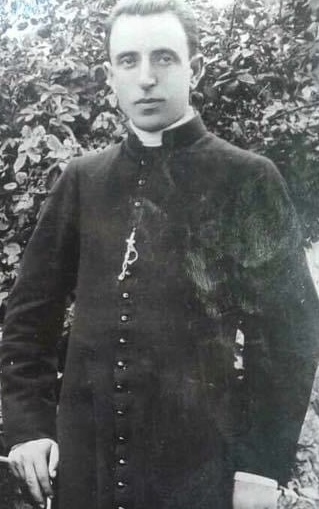

Martyr
- Born: 24 December 1898; Ferizaj, Kosovo Vilayet, Ottoman Empire
- Died: 20 October 1971 (aged 72); Fushë, Albania
- Venerated in: Roman Catholic Church
- Beatified: 5 November 2016, Shkodër Cathedral, Albania by Cardinal Angelo Amato on behalf of Pope Francis
- Feast: 5 November

Shtjefën Kurti (24 December 1898 – 20 October 1971) was an Albanian Roman Catholic priest killed during a period of communist persecution. Kurti served as a priest during a volatile period for his nation in which communist repression enjoined state atheism and led to strict rules being imposed that prevented clerics from performing their duties. Kurti continued to serve as a priest when needed, which led to his arrest with the accusation that he was colluding with spies. Kurti was arrested for the final time when it had been alleged that he secretly baptized a child which was forbidden by the regime. He was sentenced to death and executed by firing squad.

Kurti was beatified alongside other Martyrs of Albania killed during the communist repression on 5 November 2016 after their collective beatification was approved seven months prior. His liturgical feast is not affixed to the date of his death but rather on the date of the beatification as is the case with those beatified alongside him.

== Life ==
Shtjefën Kurti was born on 24 December 1898 in Ferizaj as the sixth child of Jak and Katrine Kurti.

Kurti studied in Graz and Feldkirch as well as in Innsbruck and at Rome; the Jesuits oversaw his education at one stage. He further studied at Propaganda Fide in Rome since 10 January 1919. Kurti was ordained as a priest in Rome on 13 May 1924. He then acted as a parish priest in Skopje and Novoselo near Gjakova from 1921 until 1929 but the murder of fellow Albanian priest Shtjefën Gjeçovi prompted Kurti to flee for Romania. It was there that he wrote a memorandum to the League of Nations regarding the persecution of Catholic Albanian citizens in Kosovo which was dated on 5 May 1930. Father Kurti would soon move on to serve as a priest in Shna Prendja (now Krujë) as well as in Gurës and Tirana.

On 16 September 1946 he sent a letter to Pope Pius XII informing him of the persecution and violence that was being perpetrated against the Church. Kurti was arrested for the first time in Tirana on 28 October 1946 and was imprisoned at first in Tirana and then later in Burrel. He was sentenced to death but his sentence was changed to two decades of imprisonment; he was set free on 2 May 1963 before his full sentence was concluded. His arrest was in part due to accusations that he was colluding with spies. Twice during the 1960s he suffered psychological torture which included simulated executions during the second of which he was forced to dig a grave he was made to believe would be his own. It was upon his release that he continued his duties in Tirana and this extended to Juba and Gurës. In 1967, after he prevented thugs from desecrating his church, he was arrested once again and was sentenced to forced labor with a sentence that would have ended in 1983. However, Kurti would die well before this.

In 1970 – though it was forbidden to administer the sacraments – a mother asked Kurti to baptize her son. He accepted and baptized the child in secret. This led to him being re-arrested and he was sentenced to death on 31 July 1971. The judge presiding over the trial asked whether it was true that Kurti baptized a child, to which the priest confessed he did since it was part of his role as a priest. Father Kurti was executed (firing squad) on 20 October 1971 (according to another source: February 1972) though Vatican officials did not become aware of this until 1973 because it had been kept secret from the local authorities. The news had instead been leaked.

Kurti's death was kept hidden until news leaked and reached Rome of his death. RAI television announced this news while Vatican Radio confirmed it in March 1973. L'Osservatore Romano published an article on 26 April 1973 condemning the persecution of the Church in Albania with the article being published in part due to Kurti's murder.

== Beatification ==
The beatification process could commence once it was decided where the diocesan process would be held since a group of individuals meant the diocesan process could be conducted in just one diocese. On 7 June 2002 the forum for the process was transferred from individual dioceses to Shkodrë-Pult. The cause commenced on 4 September 2002 after the Congregation for the Causes of Saints issued the edict of "nihil obstat" (nothing against) to the cause and titling the group as Servants of God which included Kurti.

The diocesan process for the investigation opened on 10 November 2002 and closed on 8 December 2010. The documents were placed in sealed boxes to be transported to the C.C.S. in Rome for assessment. The C.C.S. validated the process on 9 March 2012 and received the Positio dossier from the postulation in 2015 for further investigation. Theologians advising the C.C.S. approved the cause on 17 December 2015 while the C.C.S. members themselves also approved it on 19 April 2016. Pope Francis approved the findings and on 26 April 2016 confirmed that the 38 individuals had died "in odium fidei" (in hatred of the faith) thus approving their beatifications. Cardinal Angelo Amato presided over the beatification on the pope's behalf in Albania on 5 November 2016. Five cardinals attended the beatification as did 10,000 faithful and the Archbishop of Potenza Salvatore Ligorio. The then-cardinal-designate Ernest Simoni was also present.

The postulator for this cause is the Franciscan priest Giovangiuseppe Califano.

== See also ==
- Religion in Albania
- State atheism
- Roman Catholicism in Kosovo
- Dimiter
