= Lazër Shantoja =

Albanian Catholic priest

Blessed Lazër Shantoja
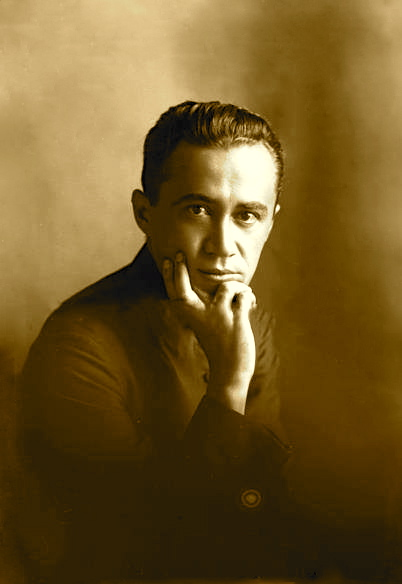
- Photo of Lazër Shantoja photographed by Kel Marubi in 1922.

Martyr
- Born: 7 July 1891; Shkodër, Scutari Vilayet, Ottoman Empire (today Albania)
- Died: 5 March 1945 (aged 53); Tirana, Albania
- Venerated in: Roman Catholic Church
- Beatified: 5 November 2016, Saint Stephen's Cathedral, Shkodër, Albania by Cardinal Angelo Amato
- Feast: 5 March

Lazër Shantoja (7 July 1891 – 5 March 1945) was an Albanian blessed, publicist, poet, satirist, and translator into Albanian from Goethe, Schiller and Leopardi, as well as his country's first Esperantist. He was one of the first Catholic priests, arrested by the communist government, and the first Albanian priest that was shot by a firing squad. He was accepted by the Catholic Church as a martyr in 2016, part of the Martyrs of Albania.

== Life ==
Shantoja was born on 7 July 1891 (although some biographers mention also 2 September 1892 as birthday) in Shkodër, Scutari Vilayet, then Ottoman Empire, son of Kel Shantoja and Luçe Blinishti. In his manuscript Shantojana - History of the Shantoja family he writes that his family originates from Vjerdha e Vjetër, a settlement close to Rragam, in the Shkodër County. Shantoja pursued elementary and high school studies at the Albanian Pontifical Seminary in Shkodër, and then, during 1912 - 1914, was in Innsbruck, Austria-Hungary, to pursue university level theological studies. His Austrian professors wrote in his graduation certificate that he was a "very talented" seminarist.

In 1914 Shantoja visited for the first time Vienna, and, on 29 May 1915, he was ordained as a priest. He started to write poetry in Albanian, Italian, German and Esperanto, and also began to translate into Albanian. In 1917 Shantoja started to serve as a parish priest in the villages of Pulaj, Beltojë, Velipojë, Rrjoll, as well as Sheldî, where he also opened the village's first school with Albanian as a language of instruction. In 1922 he became the secretary of the Archbishop of Shkodër, Mons. Lazër Mjeda. In that vest, on 17 April 1923, he had the chance to meet in Vienna, with the Chancellor of Austria, Ignaz Seipel.

When Father Anton Harapi, who would later become Member of the High Regency Council of the Albanian Kingdom (1943–44), started to publish the catholic periodical Ora e Maleve (transl. The Highland's Destiny), Shantoja and Luigj Gurakuqi were his first collaborators in writing articles for the magazine. Father Harapi would write later that Father Shantoja was the only one who helped with the writing for the magazine. In May 1924 Shantoja resigned from writing and editing for Ora e Maleve. He endorsed the Society for the Unity of the Albanian Language, and, during the burial of patriot Avni Rustemi, assassinated by a pro-monarchy individuao, Shantoja was one of the people who held a speech. He was one of the inspirators and organizers of the June Revolution, a peasant-backed insurgency. As a result of his participation in the revolution, after Zog I of Albania returned to power in December 1924, Shantoja got arrested in the following month, in January 1925. After several months in prison, he was pardoned, and left Albania for the Kingdom of Yugoslavia. On 2 October 1925, while residing in Belgrade, he wrote a touching article on the Liria Kombëtare magazine on the sudden murder of Luigj Gurakuqi. On 1 September 1926, in Cetinje Shantoja held a speech in the burial of Captain Mark Raka, dead in mysterious circumstances in a road accident.

In 1928 he left the Kingdom of Yugoslavia for Vienna, where he started to publish the periodical Ora e Shqipnisë (transl. Albania's Destiny), which was financed by Hasan Prishtina, an anti-Zog politician. Later, Shantoja went to Switzerland and started to work as a parish priest in Bienne, and then at La Motte in the Canton of Vaud, where he stayed until 1939 and took the opportunity to improve his French.

Right after the Italian invasion of Albania Shantoja returned to Albania, and held a mass at the St. Stephen's Cathedral, Shkodër. On 28 September 1939, he held a speech in the occasion of the new fascist flag of Albania, and, during the same year, he moved to Tirana, along with his mother. On 12 March 1940, Shantoja was in Naples and then in Egypt, where he met with the Albanian community and held there several speeches, which prompted the creation in Cairo and Aleksandri of the first Albanian fascist cells. On 8 November 1940, the Tomorri magazine reported an article on a meeting held in Shkodër, where Shantoja held a fired up speech.

In 1941, along with Ernest Koliqi, Mustafa Merlika-Kruja, Giuseppe Valentini, Karl Gurakuqi, Xhevat Kortsha ecc., he was one of the founders of the Institute of Sciences of Albania, the predecessor of what came to be known later as Academy of Sciences of Albania. Shantoja endorsed the government of Mustafa Kruja, in whose thoughts he saw a continuance of the political mentality of Gurakuqi. In 1943 he participated in the burial of Ndok Gjeloshi in Tirana, who had been killed by the communists. After the WW2 capitulation of Italy in September 1943 Shantoja retired from politics.

Shantoja hid from the persecution of communist regime in the Sheldi mountains, but, in the second half of December 1944 he was found there by communist agents and was arrested. Accused as a war criminal on 29 January 1945, by public prosecutor Jonuz Mersini, he proclaimed himself innocent. During the prison time, he was tortured by having both arms' and leg's bones broken, and he could walk only on his elbows and knees. Archbishop Zef Simoni, in his memories, wrote that, besides the breaking of his bones, tortures included skinning his legs with hot iron rods, and putting salt on his bare flesh, while he was never medicated. Shantoja's mother begged the prison guards to just kill him, so that his sufferings would end.

On 31 January 1945, Shantoja was sentenced to death by a military court, headed by Esat Ndreu, with members Mustafa Iljazi and Hysni Lame, whereas government prosecutor was Vaskë Koleci. On 2 February 1945, the central investigation committee for war criminals, headed by Jusuf Alibali, recommended the withholding of the military court of Shkodër decision. On 9 February 1945, the highest military court in Tirana withheld the decision. The execution by firing squad occurred on 5 March 1945, in Tirana's outskirts." Along with Shantoja, Sulçe beg Bushati was also shot by a firing squad. After the execution, Father Viktor Volaj was the last person to see the body of Shantoja. Enver Hoxha, Albania's dictator, was personally involved in Shantoja's execution.

== Works ==
Shantoja's works extend mostly on scientific and cultural articles, as well as satiric ones. He also wrote poetry, moreover, he translated many non-Albanian poets. Shantoja's full body of work was published under the care of Arben Marku in 2005. Koliqi considered Shantoja to be a fine proseist, similar in style and elegance to Faik Konica.

=== Publicist works ===
Shantoja is considered to be the first Albanian esperantist, according to Cuk Simoni, the translator of Pinocchio into Albanian as well as well-known esperantist. In 1914 he published in esperanto in the Esperanto magazine nr. 2 the article "La albana lingue".

Shantoja published in 1919 the folk tales "Për natë kazanash" (transl. For a night of bins). In 1922 he published the study "Grueja" (transl. The Woman), and, in 1927, the monologue "Peshku në det e tava në zjarm", (transl. The fish in the water and the pan on the stove), also interpreted by the artistic association "Bogdani".

Shantoja collaborated with many periodicals such as Lajmtari i zemrës s'Jezu Krishtit (transl. Messenger of the Sacred Heart of Jesus Christ) and Kalendari i Veprës Pijore (transl. Calendar of the Pious Work). Later on, he became one of the most ardent collaborators, as well as main editor of Ora e Maleve (transl. The Mountain's Ora). While an emigrant, he collaborated with Liria kombëtare (transl. Nation's Freedom), which was published in Geneva, and, in 1928, with the help of Hasan Prishtina he published his periodical Ora e Shqypnìs (transl. The Albania's Ora), as a continuation of Ora e Maleve. Further, he collaborated with other periodicals, such as Illyria, Cirka, LEKA, Kumbona e së diellës (transl. Sunday's Bell), and Shkëndija (transl. The Flame).

On 22 December 1915, he published the poem "Çinarët", as well as "Prifti i malsisë" (transl. The priest of the mountains), "Kanga e Paqes (transl. The song of peace), and "Hasan Riza Pasha". In 1927 he created the short dramatic poem "Kuvendi i dëshmorve" (transl. The gathering of the martyrs), and, in 1934, he published a cycle of poetry "Për një puthje të vetme" (transl. For only one kiss).

=== Translations ===
In 1915, when Shantoja was a seminary student, he translated Heinrich Heine's poem "Shtegtimi n'Kevlar" (German: Die Wallfahrt nach Kevlaar), and, after becoming a priest, he continued with the translation of Jankowski's "I burgosuni dhe flutura" (transl. The prisoner and the butterfly), Oscar Wilde's "Vigani egoist" (transl. The selfish giant), Schiller's "Kânga e kumbonës" (Song of the Bell), Jørgensen's "Fija prej së naltit" (transl. The Thread from Above), Leidh's "Kishëza në mal" (transl. The small Church on the Mountain), De Musset's "T'biin n'mênd" (transl. Do you remember), Weber's "Kaq shpejt dimen!" (transl. So soon, winter!), "Kumonët e mrames" (transl. The Evening Bells), and Immermann's "I harruem" (transl. Forgotten).

In 1942 he translated Giuseppe Fontanelli's "Vargje për nji vashë të vdekur" (transl. Verses for a dead girl) from the bookPensar di lei (transl. Thinking of her), from Giacomo Leopardi he translated "Silvjas" (Italian: A Silvia, transl. To Silvia), "Të pambaruemit" (transl. The unfinished), "Qetija mbas duhís" (transl. Silence after the storm), "Trumsaku vetmitar" (transl. The Lonely Sparrow), "Mêndimi zotnues" (transl. Possessive thought), "E shtundja e katundit" (transl. Saturday in the Village), "Jeta vetmitare" (transl. The Lonely Life), "Aspasia", "Përkujtimet" (transl. Memories), "Vetvetes" (transl. To myself)), and Gabriele D'Annunzio's "Shiu në halishtë" (Italian: La pioggia nel pineto, transl. Rain in the pinewoods).

In 1938 he published Goethe's Hermann and Dorothea on Leka, and then in 1940 on Shkëndija he published Part One of Goethe's Faust, which was also republished in 1944 on Hylli i Dritës.
