= Qerim Sadiku =

Albanian Catholic martyr

Blessed Qerim Sadiku

Martyr
- Born: 12 February 1919; Vusanje, Kingdom of Yugoslavia (today Montenegro)
- Died: 4 March 1946 (aged 27); Shkodër, Albania
- Venerated in: Roman Catholic Church
- Beatified: 5 November 2016, Saint Stephen's Cathedral, Shkodër, Albania by Cardinal Angelo Amato
- Feast: 5 March

Qerim Sadiku (12 February 1919 – 4 March 1946) was a Catholic Albanian blessed who had converted from Islam. He was executed by a firing squad in Shkodër along with clerics Danjel Dajani, Giovanni Fausti, Gjon Shllaku, Mark Çuni and Gjelosh Lulashi. He was accepted as a martyr by the Catholic Church in 2016, part of the Martyrs of Albania.

== Life ==
Sadiku was born in Vusanje, Montenegro, then Kingdom of Yugoslavia, on 12 February 1919 and was baptized as a Catholic. He married a Catholic woman, Marije Vata, in September 1944. Sadiku was an anticommunist, an Albanian nationalist and had been a lieutenant in the gendarmerie force under Zog I of Albania. During World War II he owned a shop in the Gjuhadol neighbourhood in Shkodër and did not become involved with politics until the end of the war.

Although he had a Muslim name, he was a Catholic, and extremely devoted to attending church functions. In church he would stay mostly in a praying position, on his knees, rather than standing. He is also remembered for going often on pilgrimages with his wife to the St Anthony Church, a holy place in Albania.

Sadiku was arrested and imprisoned in Shkodër on 3 December 1945, on the accusations of not going to vote, distributing flyers for other people to abstain from voting, and for being a member of the Albanian Union, an organisation that was considered by the communists to be "fascist". On 22 February 1946, after the trial of the members of the Albanian Union he was sentenced to death.

Sadiku was shot, at age 27, in the morning of 4 March 1946 at the Catholic Cemetery of Rrmaji in Shkodër by a firing squad of eight soldiers of the Albanian communist dictatorship government, along with clerics Danjel Dajani, Giovanni Fausti, Gjon Shllaku, Mark Çuni, and Gjelosh Lulashi. His last words were "I forgive those who may have hurt me. I forgive those who have sentenced me, as well as my executioners. Long live Christ our King. Long live Albania!" For the entire day, the bodies were left outside to terrorise the population. The following night, a mass grave was dug near the river bed, where the bodies were buried and covered with rubbish bins, in order to conceal the traces of the execution. Sadiku's child was born to Marije six months after he was killed.

In 2016, Sadiku was accepted by the Catholic Church as a blessed, part of the Martyrs of Albania. The beatification ceremony was presided over by Cardinal Angelo Amato at the Shkodër Cathedral, Albania.

== Sources ==
- Leonardo Di Pinto (2016). Imzot Vinçenc Prennushi me shokë martirë: profil historik hagjiografik. Enti Botues Arqipeshkvia Shkodër-Pult. ISBN 978-99927-955-8-3.
