= Arjan Dodaj =

Albanian Roman Catholic archbishop (born 1977)

His Excellency, The Most Reverend Arjan Dodaj F.D.C.
- Archbishop of Tiranë–Durrës
- Church: Catholic Church
- Archdiocese: Roman Catholic Archdiocese of Tiranë–Durrës
- Appointed: 30 November 2021
- Predecessor: George Anthony Frendo

Orders
- Ordination: 11 May 2003 by Pope John Paul II
- Consecration: 15 September 2020 by George Anthony Frendo

Personal details
- Born: 21 January 1977 (age 49) Laç, Albania
- Education: Pontifical Athenaeum Regina Apostolorum
- Motto: Ecce Mater Tua
- Coat of arms

Arjan Dodaj F.D.C. (born 21 January 1977) is an Albanian Roman Catholic prelate who has served as the Archbishop of Tiranë–Durrës since 2021. He previously served as auxiliary bishop of the same archdiocese from 2020 to 2021.

== Early life and education ==
Dodaj was born on 21 January 1977 in Laç in the region of Kurbin, Albania.

In 1993, after completing his studies in his hometown, he emigrated to Italy and settled in Cuneo, where he began working.

In 1997 he entered the Priestly Fraternity of the Sons of the Cross (Community “House of Mary”) in Rome. He studied philosophy and theology at the Pontifical Athenaeum Regina Apostolorum.

== Priestly ministry ==
Dodaj was ordained a priest on 11 May 2003 by Pope John Paul II in St. Peter's Basilica.

Following his ordination, he served in various pastoral roles in the Diocese of Rome. These included parish ministry at the parish of Saint Dominic Guzman, vice-rector of the rectorate of San Giovanni della Malva in Trastevere, and chaplain of the Albanian Catholic community in Rome.

From 2005 to 2017 he served as assistant parish priest at the parish of Saint Raphael the Archangel in Rome.

In 2017 he was sent as a fidei donum priest to the Archdiocese of Tiranë–Durrës in Albania, where he served as vicar general, parish priest of the parish of the Immaculate Heart of Mary in Gramëz, head of university pastoral ministry, and secretary of the diocesan synod.

== Episcopal ministry ==
On 9 April 2020, Pope Francis appointed Dodaj auxiliary bishop of the Archdiocese of Tiranë–Durrës and titular bishop of Lestrona. He received episcopal consecration on 15 September 2020 in the Cathedral of Saint Paul in Tirana.

On 30 November 2021, Pope Francis appointed him metropolitan archbishop of Tiranë–Durrës, succeeding Archbishop George Anthony Frendo. He took possession of the archdiocese in January 2022.

== See also ==
- Catholic Church in Albania
- Roman Catholic Archdiocese of Tiranë–Durrës
