= Maria Tuci =

Albanian laywoman and one of the 38 martyrs of Albania

Blessed Maria Tuci
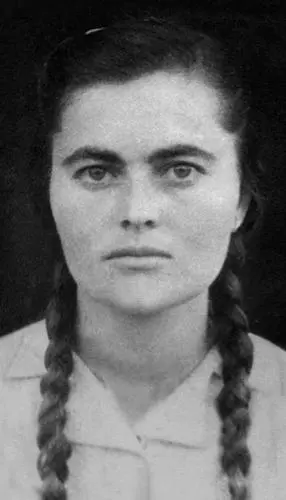
- Photo of venerable blessed Maria Tuci.

Martyr, Venerable
- Born: March 12, 1928; Ndorfushaz, near Rreshen, Albania
- Died: October 24, 1950 (aged 22); Shkodra Prison Hospital
- Cause of death: Subjected to prolonged torture.
- Venerated in: Roman Catholicism
- Beatified: November 5th 2016, Cathedral of Shën Shjeftenit, Shkodër by Pope Francis
- Feast: 24th October

Maria Tuci was an Albanian laywoman and one of the 38 martyrs of Albania. She was tortured and killed by the communist regime of Albanian dictator Enver Hoxha.

== Life ==
Maria was born in the village of Ndorfushaz, near Rrëshen in Albania and was born into a devout Roman catholic family. Maria received her education at Stigmatine school and always had the desire of becoming a great servant of God. She loved her faith and considered being a nun.

After completing her education, she became an elementary school teacher and a catechist who taught her knowledge of the Catholic Christian faith to young children.

== Arrest and martyrdom ==
On 10 August 1949, she was arrested by the Sigurimi, the Albanian secret police force, and sent to a prison in Shkodër. She refused to comply with any of the demands and orders the officers had given to her and she was subjected to prolonged torture.

From all her brutal wounds and torture, she died on 24 October 1950 at the age of 22 in the prison hospital she was placed in in Shkodra. She died with a rosary in her hand. Before she died, she said:

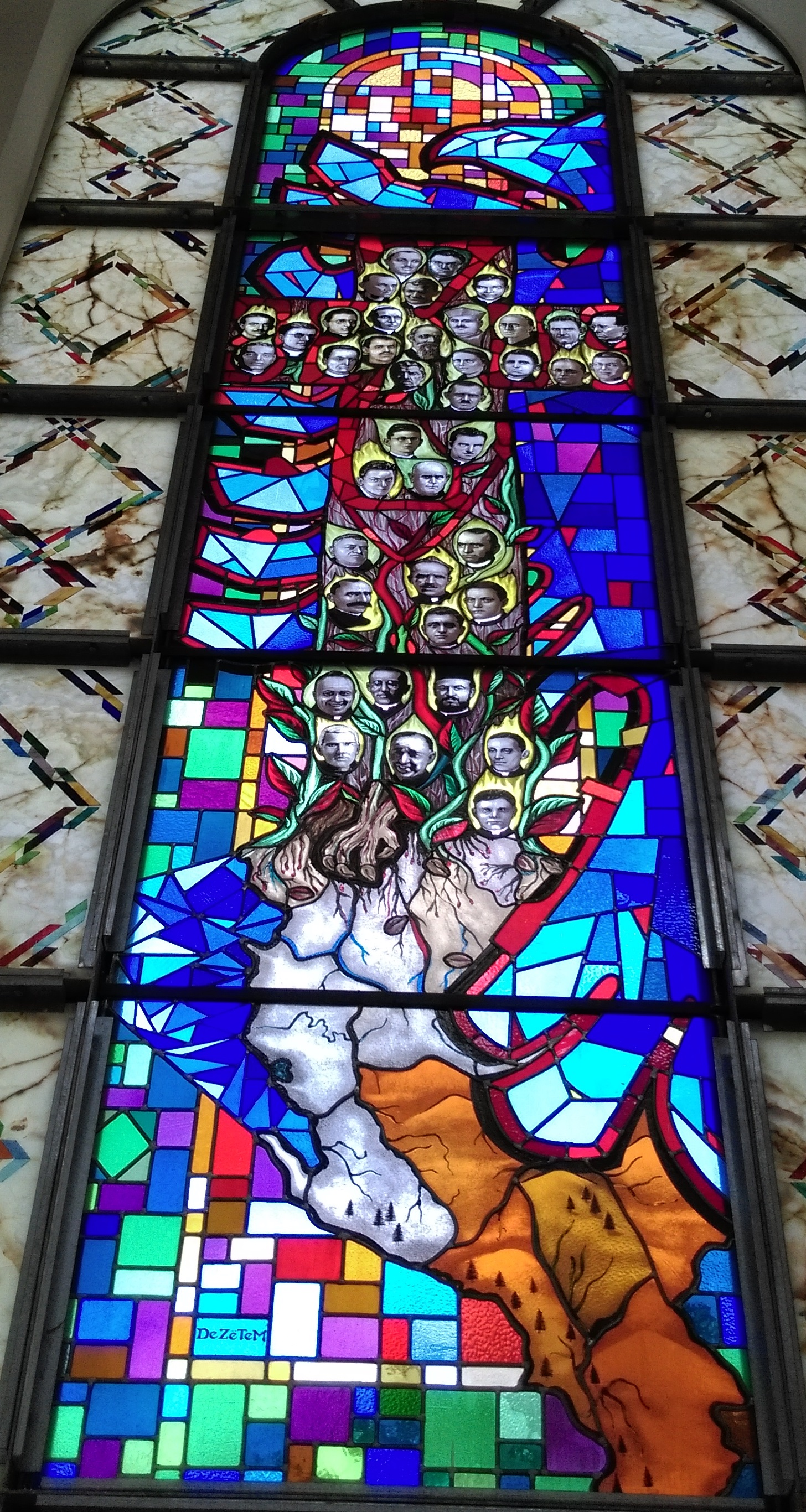
Stained glass depiction of Martyrs of Albania at the Cathedral of Saint Mother Teresa in Pristina.

“I thank God because he gave me the strength to die free.”

== Legacy ==
On 26 April 2016, Pope Francis had recognised her heroic act and awarded her with the Roman Catholic title venerable. On 5 November 2016, she was beatified by Pope Francis in a ceremony held at the Square of the Cathedral of Shën Shtjeftenit in Shkodër, Albania. The mass was conducted by Cardinal Angelo Amato. Her feast day is 24 October, on the anniversary day of her death. She is nicknamed “the modern Saint Agnes”
