= Çiprian Nika =

Albanian Franciscan, teacher, and publicist

Blessed Çiprian Nika OFM
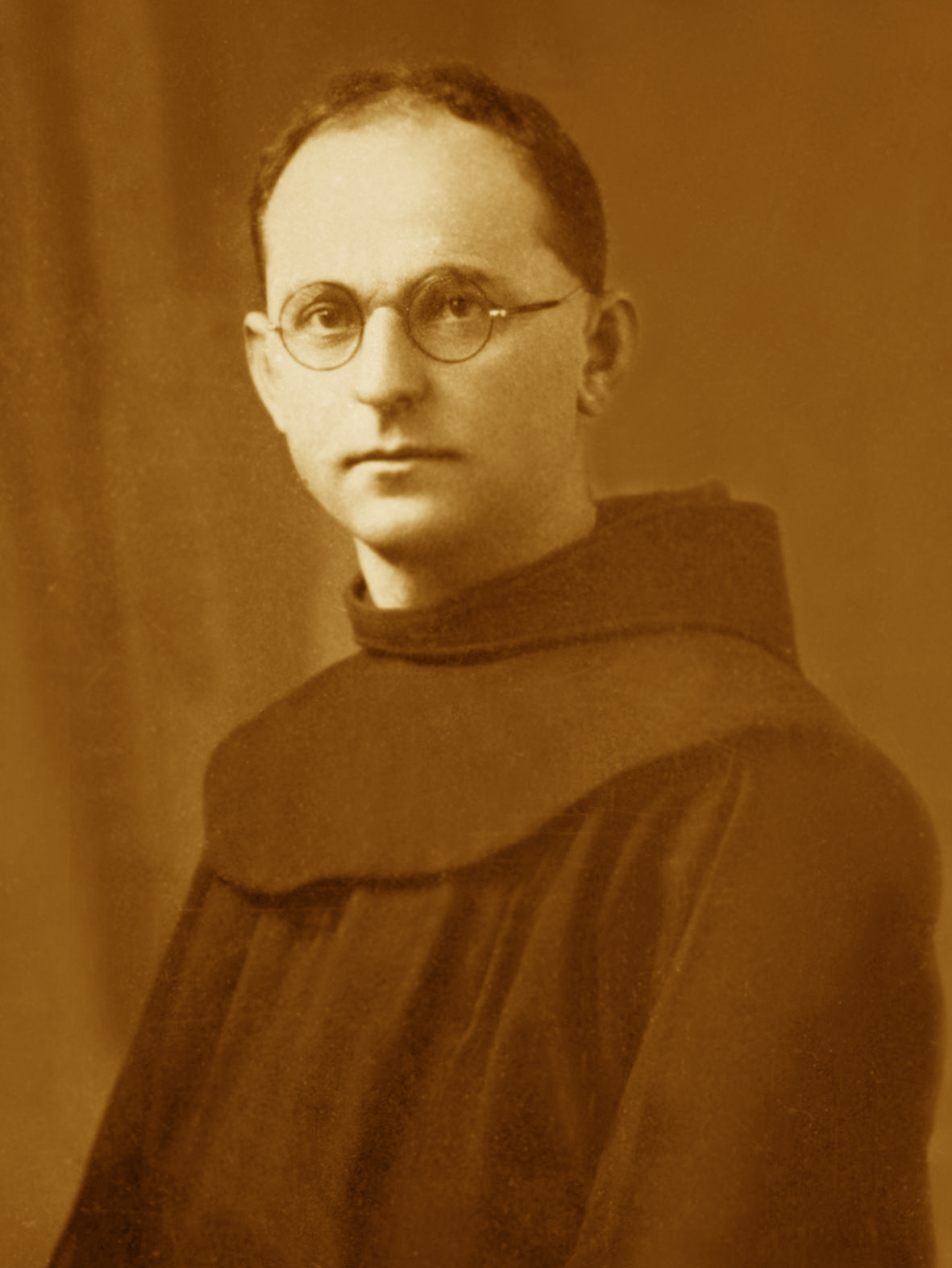
- Photo of Çiprian Nika most likely photographed by Kel Marubi.

Personal details
- Born: Dedë Nika; 19 July 1900 Shosh, Shkodër, Ottoman Empire (today Albania)
- Died: 19 March 1948 (aged 47) Zall i Kirit, Shkodër, Albania

Sainthood
- Feast day: 5 November
- Venerated in: Roman Catholic Church
- Beatified: 5 November 2016; Saint Stephen's Cathedral, Shkodër, Albania by Cardinal Angelo Amato

Çiprian Nika, OFM (Shkodër, 19 July 1900 – 11 March 1948) was an Albanian Catholic priest, Franciscan, teacher, and publicist.

The diocesan process for his beatification was announced on November 10, 2002, by Cardinal Crescenzio Sepe, then Prefect of the Congregation for the Evangelization of Peoples, during the Eucharist at St. Stephen’s Cathedral, Shkodër. Nika was beatified on 5 November 2016, in the square in front of the cathedral.

== Biography ==
He was born in Shkodër as Deda, to Mëhill Nikë and Prenda Ali Mirashi from the village of Celaj (now Shosh). Deda was orphaned of his mother at the age of five and brought to a local Franciscan orphanage. He excelled as a student and took his calling in the Order of Saint Francis. He entered the priesthood on 16 October 1916; took the provisional conditions on 23 October 1917; was ordained on 16 September 1921; and celebrated his first Mass on 25 July 1924.

After completing his theological studies in Austria, he took the Franciscan name Cyprian in the Order of Friars Minor. He returned to Shkodër to teach at the Illyricum school. Under the direction of Father Martin Gjoka, he also participated in the Franciscan wind orchestra of around 40 people, in which he played the flute.

In 1939, he took over the post of provincial deputy, succeeding Mati Prennushi as provincial guardian in 1943.

With the advent of the People's Socialist Republic of Albania, Nika was arrested and accused of hiding weapons. On 28 December 1947, the Trial Panel ruled that he was to die by firing squad and that Pal Dodaj of Janjevo was to be imprisoned for life. Nika was shot on 11 March 1948, at 5:00 in the morning, in the prison surrounded by his associates.
