= Sacred Heart Church (Tirana) =

Catholic church in Albania

Sacred Heart Church of Tirana Kisha Zemra e Krishtit
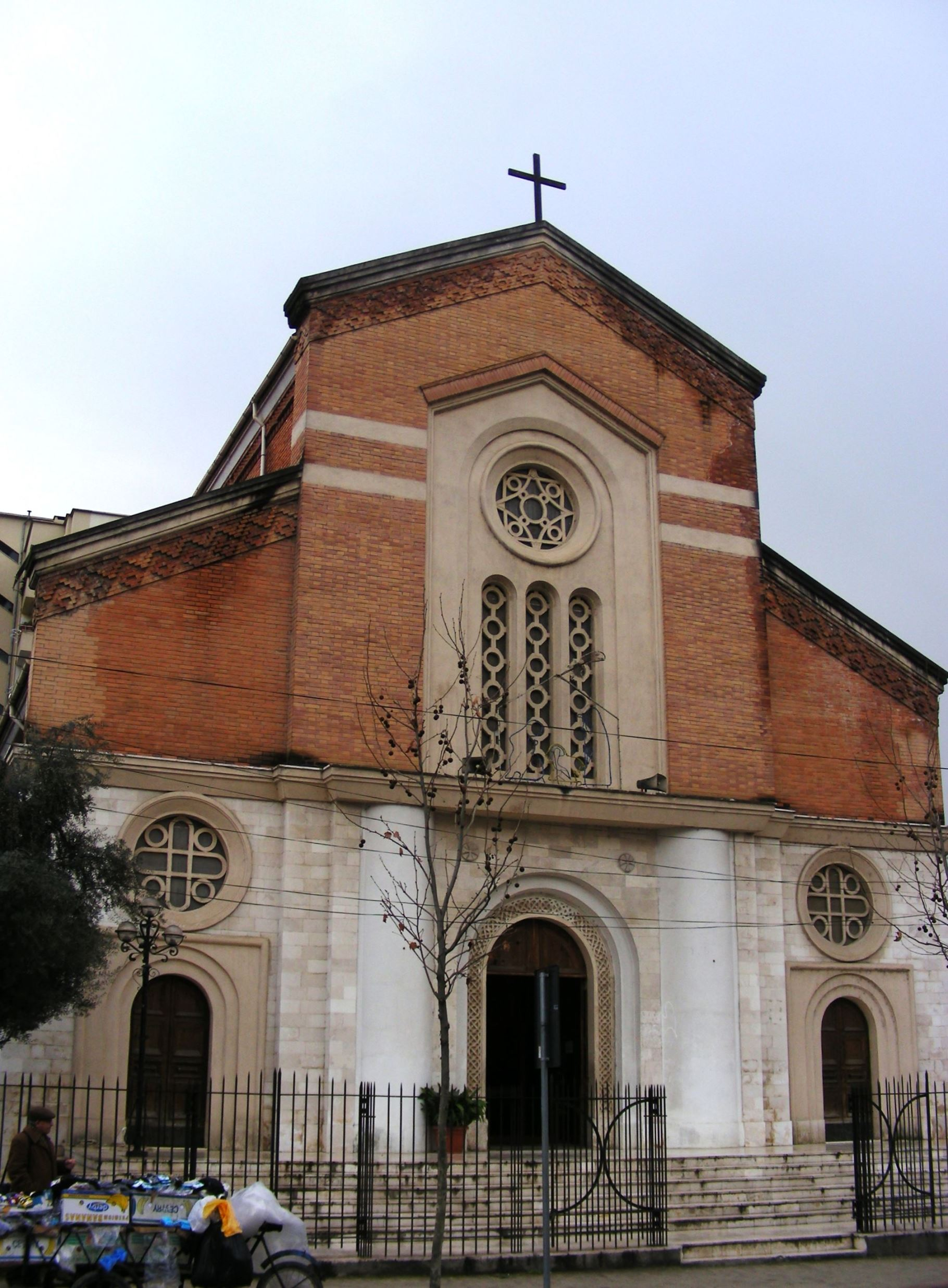

- Location within Albania

Religion
- Affiliation: Roman Catholic
- Province: Tirana
- Ecclesiastical or organisational status: Church
- Leadership: Roman Catholic Archdiocese of Tiranë-Durrës

Location
- State: Albania

The Sacred Heart Church (Albanian: Zemra e Krishtit Catholic Church of Tirana) is a Roman Catholic church in Tirana, Albania. Built in 1939 during the Italian invasion of Albania, it is the oldest Catholic church in the city.

== History ==
The Sacred Heart Church was built in 1939 by the Italians during the Italian invasion of Albania and inaugurated in 24 December 1939. It was closed in 1967 when all religions were banned in Albania.

During the 1967-1990 religion ban in Albania, the church was used as a hideout by Catholics to pray in the house of God despite its state of disrepair. During that period, a wall was erected in front of the façade of the church.

It reopened in 1990. The bell-tower had been destroyed, but the bell was saved. Since the neighboring Orthodox church had a bell-tower but no bell, the Sacred Heart's bell was given to them. Thus the two churches symbolically use the same instrument to call the faithful. The Christian community also benefited from the aid received by the Muslims of Albania that was shared by the Catholic entities. The program Aid to the Church in Need also raised funds to restore the church.

In 1991, Mother Teresa paid a visit to the church, which used to be her elementary school, and located on the street she lived on. Mother Teresa received her first communion and confirmation in the Sacred Heart Church of Skopje.

== See also ==
- List of Jesuit sites
