= St. Paul's Cathedral, Tirana =

Roman Catholic cathedral in Tirana, Albania

Coordinates: 41°19′29″N 19°49′17″E

Saint Paul's Cathedral Katedralja e Shën Palit
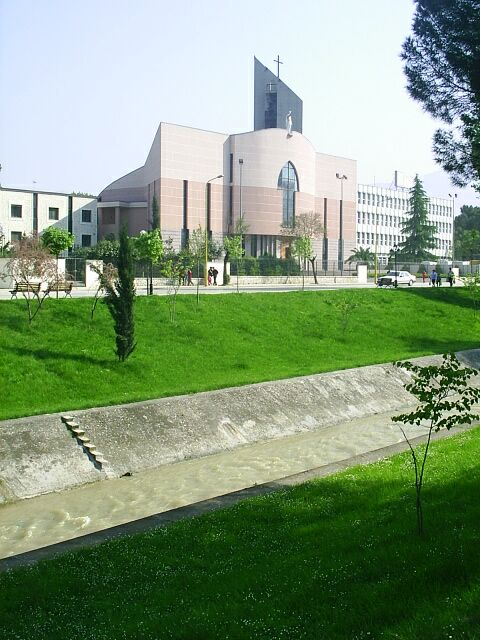
- St Paul's Catholic Cathedral from the Square.

Religion
- Affiliation: Roman Catholic
- Diocese: Archdiocese of Tiranë-Durrës
- Ecclesiastical or organisational status: Cathedral
- Year consecrated: 2002
- Status: Active

Location
- Location: Tiranë, Albania
- Interactive map of Saint Paul's Cathedral; Katedralja e Shën Palit

Architecture
- Groundbreaking: 1993
- Completed: 2002

St Paul's Cathedral is a cathedral in Tirana, Albania. It belongs to the Roman Catholic Archdiocese of Tiranë-Durrës. The stained glass window to the left of the front door features Pope John Paul II and Mother Teresa. Also a statue of Mother Teresa can be found at the entrance of the cathedral. It is a modern-looking building and does not resemble a traditional church.

== Architecture ==
When Pope John Paull II visited Albania in 1993, he laid the cornerstone for the church. It was inaugurated on 26 January 2002.

The cathedral is built using a combined triangle and circle shape, representing the Trinity and God's Eternity respectively, and features a relatively plain interior. At the back is a baptismal font with a Paschal candle. A statue of the apostle Paul is set on the top of the building.

== See also ==
- Rrok Mirdita
- Sacred Heart Church (Tirana)
