= Rrok Mirdita =

Albanian prelate of the Catholic Church (1939–2015)

His Excellency Rrok Kolë Mirdita
- Archbishop of Tiranë–Durrës
- Church: Catholic
- Archdiocese: Tiranë–Durrës
- Appointed: 25 December 1992
- Installed: 25 April 1993
- Term ended: 7 December 2015
- Predecessor: Vinçenc Prennushi
- Successor: George Anthony Frendo

Orders
- Ordination: 2 July 1965 by Aleksandar Tokic
- Consecration: 25 April 1993 by Pope John Paul II

Personal details
- Born: 28 September 1939 Klezna, Kingdom of Yugoslavia
- Died: 7 December 2015 (aged 76) Tirana, Albania
- Motto: Ut omnes unum sint (Latin for 'That they may all be one')

Styles of Rrok Mirdita
- Reference style: The Most Reverend
- Spoken style: Your Excellency
- Religious style: Monsignor
- Posthumous style: none

Rrok Kolë Mirdita (28 September 1939 – 7 December 2015) was an Albanian prelate of the Catholic Church who served as the archbishop of Tiranë–Durrës from 1993 to his death in 2015.

== Biography ==
Mirdita was ordained a priest on 2 July 1965, aged 25, and served in ethnic Albanian parishes in Bronx and Westchester counties of New York.

On 25 December 1992, aged 53, he was appointed the archbishop of Tiranë–Durrës and consecrated on 25 April 1993 by Pope John Paul II and cardinals Camillo Ruini and Jozef Tomko during the Pope's pastoral visit to Albania. Mirdita was the President of the Episcopal Conference of Albania, as well as the President of Caritas Albania from 1994 to 2000.

He died at Mother Teresa Hospital in Tirana on 7 December 2015.

Catholic Church titles
Preceded by New title	Archbishop of Tiranë–Durrës; 1992–2015	Succeeded by George Anthony Frendo
