= George Anthony Frendo =

Maltese Catholic archbishop (born 1946)

Monsignor George Anthony Frendo OP MQR
- Archbishop emeritus of Tiranë-Durrës
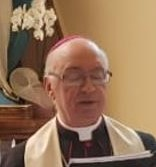
- George Anthony Frendo (2020)
- Archdiocese: Tiranë-Durrës
- Appointed: 17 November 2016
- Installed: 3 December 2016
- Predecessor: Rrok Mirdita
- Successor: Arjan Dodaj
- Other post: Titular Bishop of Buthrotum

Orders
- Ordination: 7 April 1969 by Emanuele Gerada
- Consecration: 23 September 2006 by Rrok Mirdita
- Rank: Archbishop

Personal details
- Born: 4 April 1946 (age 80) Qormi, Crown Colony of Malta

- Coat of arms

George Anthony Frendo OP (born 4 April 1946) is a Maltese-born Albanian prelate and the archbishop emeritus of Tiranë-Durrës in Albania.

== Biography ==
George Frendo was born in Qormi, Malta on 4 April 1946. At the age of 15 he was professed as a member of the order of preachers. In 1963, Frendo started his studies for the priesthood together with Paul Cremona, later the Archbishop of Malta. Both Frendo and Cremona were ordained priests by Emanuele Gerada on 2 April 1969. Frendo served eight years as the parish priest of Gwardamanġa.

On 7 July 2006, Pope Benedict XVI appointed Frendo Auxiliary Bishop of Tiranë-Durrës in Albania with the titular see of Buthrotum. He was consecrated on 23 September 2006, by Rrok Kola Mirdita the Archbishop of Tiranë-Durrës and co-consecrated by the Apostolic Nuncio John Bulaitis and Archbishop Joseph Mercieca of Malta.

On 17 November 2016, Pope Francis appointed Bishop Frendo as the Archbishop of Tiranë-Durrës in Albania. He was installed on 3 December 2016.

On 20 April 2018, Frendo obtained Albanian citizenship.

== Honours ==
He was awarded the Midalja għall-Qadi tar-Repubblika on 13 December 2024, as part of the awards ceremony of the 50th anniversary of Malta becoming a republic.
