= Roman Catholic Archdiocese of Tiranë–Durrës =

Latin Catholic archdiocese in Albania

Coordinates: 41.3247°N 19.8219°E

Archdiocese of Tiranë-Durrës Archidioecesis Tiranensis-Dyrracena Kryedioqeza e Tiranë-Durrës

Catholic
- Coat of arms

Location
- Country: Albania
- Ecclesiastical province: Tiranë-Durrës

Statistics
- Area: 2,263 km^{2} (874 sq mi)
- Population: Total; Catholics: (as of 2014); 1,206,000; 530,640 (44%)

Information
- Sui iuris church: Latin Church
- Rite: Latin Rite
- Established: 13th century
- Cathedral: Cathedral of St. Paul in Tirana
- Co-cathedral: St.Lucia Co-cathedral Durrës

Current leadership
- Pope: Leo XIV
- Metropolitan Archbishop: Arjan Dodaj
- Vicar General: Bernard Caruana O.P.

Map
- Archdiocese of Tiranë–Durrës Suffragan dioceses

The Archdiocese of Tiranë–Durrës (Latin: Archidioecesis Tiranensis-Dyrracena) is a Latin Church Metropolitan archdiocese of the Catholic Church in Albania.

Its cathedral episcopal see is Katedrale e Shën Palit, in the city of Tirana, where also stands the former Cathedral: Kisha e Zemrës së Shenjtë të Jezusit Kisha e Zemrës së Shenjtë të Jezusit.

== History ==
- In 1205, during the aftermath of the Fourth Crusade, coastal regions of Byzantine Theme of Dyrrhachium (modern Durrës) were conquered by the Republic of Venice, and organized as the Duchy of Durazzo.
- In 1209, Metropolitan Archdiocese of Durrës (Latin Rite) was established by pope Innocent III.
- Demoted circa 1400? as Archdiocese of Durrës
- In 1640, it gained territories from the suppressed Diocese of Arbano and from the Diocese of Stephaniacum
- On 10 March 1926 it lost territory to the Metropolitan Archdiocese of Corfu–Zakynthos–Kefalonia (in Ionian insular Greece)
- On 11 November 1939 it lost some territory (southern regions) to the Apostolic Administration of Southern Albania.
- Renamed on 23 December 1992 to Archdiocese of Durrës–Tiranë
- On 7 December 1996, it lost territory to a suffragan, the Rrëshen
- 25 January 2005: Promoted as Metropolitan Archdiocese of Tiranë–Durrës
- Pope Francis visited the Diocese in September 2014.

== Province ==
Initial ecclesiastical province, centered in Durrës, was formed in the aftermath of the Fourth Crusade, when coastal regions of Byzantine Theme of Dyrrhachium were conquered by the Republic of Venice, and organized as the Duchy of Durazzo. In 1209, Pope Innocent III confirmed Manfredo as Archbishop of Durrës (Latin Rite), with jurisdiction over the region, thus establishing the Roman Catholic Metropolitan Province of Durrës, that was later reorganized.

Modern ecclesiastical province was created in 2005, and includes the Metropolitan's own Archdiocese and the following Suffragan sees :

- Roman Catholic Diocese of Rrëshen
- Apostolic Administration of Southern Albania (a type of pre-diocesan jurisdiction usually left exempt)

== Episcopal ordinaries ==
(all Roman Rite)

Metropolitan Archbishops of Durrës

- incomplete
- Manfredo (1209–1211)
- ...
- Antonio (1296?–1301?)
- Pietro (1303?–1304?)
- Matteo (1320? – death 1334?)
- Pietro da Geronsa, Friars Minor (O.F.M.) (1340.03.23 – ?)
- Angelo, O.F.M. (1344 – ?)
- Antonio da Alessandria, O.F.M. (1349.05.25 – ?), previously Titular Archbishop of Hierapolis (1346.07.31 – 1349.05.25)
- Demetrio (1363.12.20 – ?), previously Bishop of Stephaniacum (? – 1363.12.20)
- Giovanni (1388.09.28 – ?)
- Stefano da Napoli, Carmelites (O. Carm.) (1394.06.03 – ?)
- Giovanni Bonifacio Panella (1395.05.15 – 1399.05.16; died 1418?), previously Bishop of Ferentino (Italy) (1392.03.08 – 1395.05.15) and Bishop of Sulmona (Italy) (1395–?); later Archbishop-Bishop of Capaccio (Italy) (1399.05.16 – 1405.04.13), Bishop of Muro Lucano (Italy) (1405.04.13 – 1418?)
- Leonardo Piermicheli (1399.06.05 – ?)

Exempt Archbishops of Durrës

- Minore (1403.09.13 – ?), previously Bishop of Suacia (? – 1403.09.13)
- Giovanni di Durazzo, Dominican Order (O.P.) (1412.10.01 – death 1422)
- Nicola di Cosma, O.F.M. (1422.07.06 – ?)
- Giovanni de Monte (1429.10.21 – death 1441?)
- Giacomo da Cortino (1457.01.26 – ?)
- Stefano Birello, Servites (O.S.M.) (1458.03.09 – death 1459)
- Paolo Angelo (1460.05.19 – ?)
- Nicola Barbuti, O.P. (1469.05.05 – ?)
- Marco Cattaneo (1474.11.16 – death 1487.08)
- Martino Firmani (1492.02.18 – 1499.08.06)
- Francesco Quirini (1499.11.27 – death 1505.08.01), previously Bishop of Šibenik (Croatia) (1491 – 1495)
- Nicola Foresio (1505.09.01 – death 1510)
- Gabriele Mascioli Foschi, Augustinians (O.E.S.A.) (1511 – death 1534.10.25)
- Giorgio Stemagu (1535.06.21 – death 1540?)
- Ludovico Bianchi, Conventual Franciscans (O.F.M. Conv.) (1540.04.16 – ?)
- Decio Carafa (1608? – 1613.01.07), previously Titular Archbishop of Damascus (1606.05.17 – 1611.08.17), Apostolic Nuncio (papal ambassador) to Spain (1607.05.22 – 1611.08); created Cardinal-Priest of S. Lorenzo in Panisperna (1612.05.07 – 1612.06.18), transferred Cardinal-Priest of Ss. Giovanni e Paolo (1612.06.18 – 1626.01.23), later Metropolitan Archbishop of Napoli (Italy) (1613.01.07 – 1626.01.23), Apostolic Nuncio to Austria-Hungary (1621 – death 1626.01.23)
- Antonio Provana (1622.07.21 – 1632.01.07), later Metropolitan Archbishop of Torino (Italy) (1632.01.07 – death 1640.07.25)
- Girolamo Greco (1634 – ?)
- Marcus Scura, O.F.M. (1640.09.10 – death 1656.04.27), previously Bishop of Arbano (1635.10.01 – death 1640.09.10)
- Nicola Carpegna (1657.08.27 – death 1670)
- Gerardo Galata (1670.05.19 – death 1696?)
- Apostolic Administrator Nicola Vladagni (1698.06.27 – 1700.03.30), while Bishop of Lezhë (Albania) (1692.10.15 – 1705?)
- Pietro Zumi (1700.03.30 – death 1720)
- Pietro Scurra (1720.09.30 – death 1737), previously Bishop of Pult (Albania) (1719.05.15 – 1720.09.30)
- Giovanni Galata (1739.01.26 – death 1752), previously Bishop of Sapë (Albania) (1720.09.30 – 1728.11.15) and Apostolic Administrator of Pult (Albania) (1720.12.23 – 1728.11.15), Bishop of Lezhë (Albania) (1728.11.15 – 1739.01.26)
- Nicolò Angelo Radovani (1752.12.18 – death 1774?)
- Tommaso Mariagni (1774.06.27 – death 1808?)
- Paul Galata (1808 – death 1836.08.12), succeeding as former Coadjutor Archbishop of Durrës (1803.09.09 – 1808) & Titular Bishop of Tænarum (1803.09.09 – 1808)
- Nicola Bianchi (1838.06.26 – death 1843.05.17)
- Giorgio Labella, O.F.M. (1844.11.26 – death 1847.06.04)
- Raffaele d’Ambrosio, O.F.M. (1847.12.17 – 1893.07.14), later Titular Archbishop of Acrida (1893.07.14 – ?)
- Primo Bianchi (1893.07.17 – 1922), later Titular Archbishop of Cassiope (see) (1922.06.12 – death 1927.08.19)
- Francesco Melchiori, O.F.M. (1922.05.22 – death 1928), succeeding as former Coadjutor Archbishop of Durrës (1921.09.28 – 1922.05.22) & Titular Archbishop of Modon (1921.09.28 – 1922.05.22)
- Pietro Gjura (1929.05.15 – death 1939.07.09)
- Vinçenc Prennushi, O.F.M. (1940.06.26 – death 1949.03.19), also Apostolic Administrator of Southern Albania of the Albanese (Albania) (1946 – 1949.03.19); previously Bishop of Sapë (Albania) (1936.01.27 – 1940.06.26)
- Apostolic Administrator Nikollë Troshani (1958.04.18 – 1992), Titular Bishop of Cisamus (1958.04.18 – death 1994.05.25), no other office

Archbishop of Durrës–Tiranë

- Archbishop Rrok Mirdita (1992.12.25 – 2005.01.25 see below), also President of Episcopal Conference of Albania (1997 – 2000)

Metropolitan Archbishops of Tiranë-Durrës

- Archbishop Rrok Mirdita (see above 2005.01.25 – death 2015.12.07), also President of Episcopal Conference of Albania (2006 – 2012.09)
- Archbishop George Anthony Frendo, O.P. (2016.12.03 – 2021.11.30)
- Archbishop Arjan Dodaj, (2021.11.30 - present)

== See also ==
- Catholic Church in Albania
- Kingdom of Albania (medieval)
- Albanian Orthodox Archbishopric of Tiranë-Durrës

== Sources ==
- Dragojlović, Dragoljub (1993). "Das katholische Erzbistum im Herzogtum von Durazzo anfang des 13. Jahrhunderts" (PDF). Balcanica. 24: 51–59.
- Elsie, Robert (2001). A Dictionary of Albanian Religion, Mythology and Folk Culture. London: Hurst & Company. ISBN 9781850655701.
- Fine, John Van Antwerp Jr. (1994) [1987]. The Late Medieval Balkans: A Critical Survey from the Late Twelfth Century to the Ottoman Conquest. Ann Arbor, Michigan: University of Michigan Press. ISBN 0472082604.
- Nicol, Donald M. (1957). The Despotate of Epiros (1. ed.). Oxford: Blackwell.
- Thallóczy, Ludovicus; Jireček, Constantinus; Sufflay, Emilianus, eds. (1913). Acta et diplomata res Albaniae mediae aetatis illustrantia. Vol. 1. Vindobonae: Typis Adolphi Holzhausen.
- Thallóczy, Ludovicus; Jireček, Constantinus; Sufflay, Emilianus, eds. (1918). Acta et diplomata res Albaniae mediae aetatis illustrantia. Vol. 2. Vindobonae: Typis Adolphi Holzhausen.
