= St. Stephen's Cathedral, Shkodër =

Roman Catholic cathedral in Shkodër, Albania

St Stephen's Cathedral Katedralja e Shën Shtjefnit
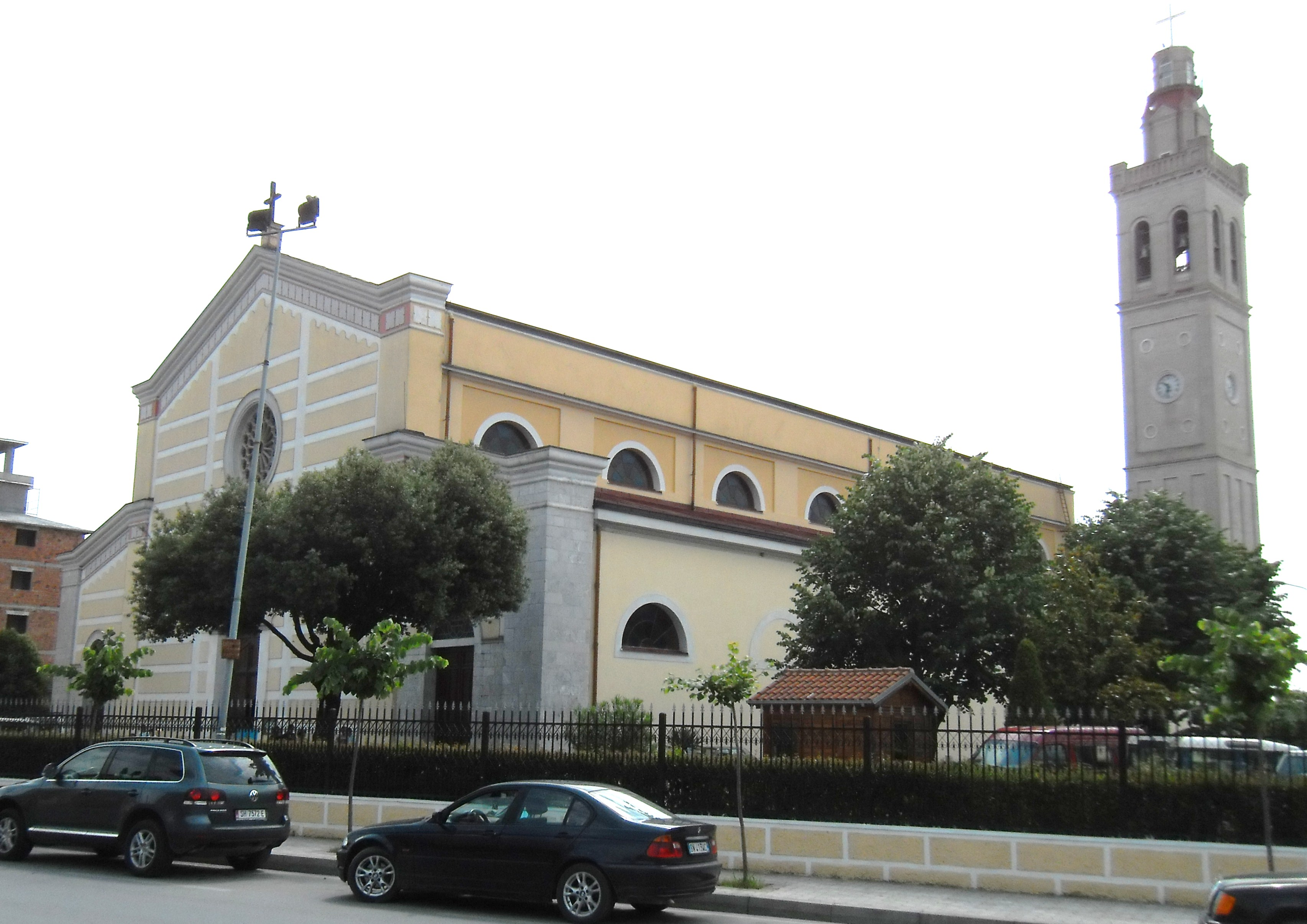
- St Stephen's Catholic Cathedral from the Square.

Religion
- Affiliation: Roman Catholic
- Diocese: Archdiocese of Shkodër-Pult
- Ecclesiastical or organisational status: Cathedral
- Year consecrated: 1867
- Status: Active

Location
- Location: Shkodër, Albania
- Interactive map of St Stephen's Cathedral; Katedralja e Shën Shtjefnit
- Coordinates: 42°3′55″N 19°31′12″E

Architecture
- Groundbreaking: 1858
- Completed: 1867

Specifications
- Length: 74 metres (243 ft)
- Width: 50 metres (164 ft)
- Height (max): 23.5 metres (77 ft)

St Stephen's Catholic Church, also known as Shkodër Cathedral (Albanian: Katedralja e Shkodrës or Kisha e Madhe - "Grand Church"), is a cathedral in the city of Shkodër in northwestern Albania. The Roman Catholic cathedral is dedicated to Saint Stephen.

During the Siege of Scutari (1912–1913) the cathedral was damaged by the Montenegrin army, particularly the south east side, causing fire in the bell tower. The cathedral was closed in 1967 and reopened in 1990.

== History ==
The dedication of this church to Saint Stephen, the first patron saint of the city, follows that of a preexisting church with that name, now covered by the Rozafa Castle, and on whose remains a mosque was built. Marin Barleti, a notable 16th-century Albanian writer, mentions the former church and the saint patron of the city in his Historia de vita et gestis Scanderbegi Epirotarum principis (The story of life and deeds of Skanderbeg, the prince of Epirotes), when he describes the Siege of Shkodra which lasted from 1478 to 25 April 1479 and saw the League of Lezhë helplessly protect the castle from the Ottoman Empire army, until the castle eventually fell to Turkish hands.

During the first three centuries of the Ottoman occupation, the bishops of the city were constrained to live outside the city. In 1762, 5 years after the formation Pashalik of Scutari, the first Albanian Pashalik under the Bushati family, Monsignor Pal Pjeter Kamsi was finally allowed again to reside in the city.

In 1851, after the faithful had continuously applied for the permission from the Sultan for the building of the church, Abdülmecid I issued the decree.

The dome, firstly built in wood, almost fell off 35 years after construction, so in 1897 it was replaced which other materials which last to today. In 1909, Albanian painter Kolë Idromeno coffered the vault. His paintings in the vault can still be seen today, especially that of Lady of Shkodër followed by two angels who are dressed in Shkodër folk costumes. In the background is the city of Shkodër, surrounded by Rozafa castle.

An earthquake in 1905 and the bombing of 12 March 1913 during the Siege of Scutari damaged the bell tower and the clock, which had been given by the Kakarriqi brothers. In 1925, the Kakarriqi family purchased another clock which worked till 1967, when the church was transformed into a Palace of Sports following the Cultural Revolution. Ironically, even the Congress of the Communist Women of Albania was held in the cathedral in 1973. The towers were destroyed in 1967 and the portal was boarded up.

In 1990 the cathedral was reopened and on November 11, 1990, the first Mass in the country since 1967 was held in the cathedral. A symbolic Mass was held in the cathedral on March 21, 1991. In 1993 it was visited by Pope John Paul II.

== Structure and construction ==
=== Background ===
Legend has it that the discussion on the size of the cathedral was decided upon the agreement that the size should be as long the throwing of a string from the stripes of one skinned cow. Gjergj Nikë Sheldija, who was present in that discussion, has told that the string was firstly taken into the hands of the Scutari's Wāli, who put it into his little finger and threw it. After his throwing the consul of United Kingdom threw it much further, the consul of France even further, and the consuls of Russia, Greece, and even the Austro-Hungarian Empire went much further than that of the Wāli. This one, smiling under his moustache, is said to have murmured: "You probably want to put here all the Catholics of Albania".

=== Construction ===
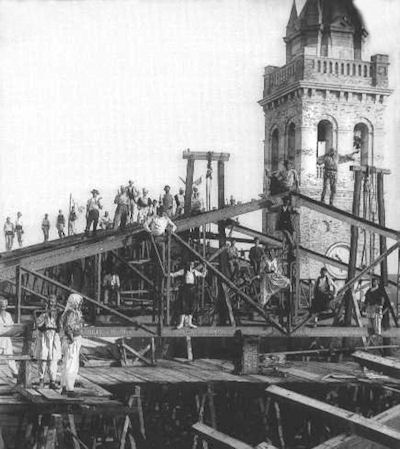
Construction

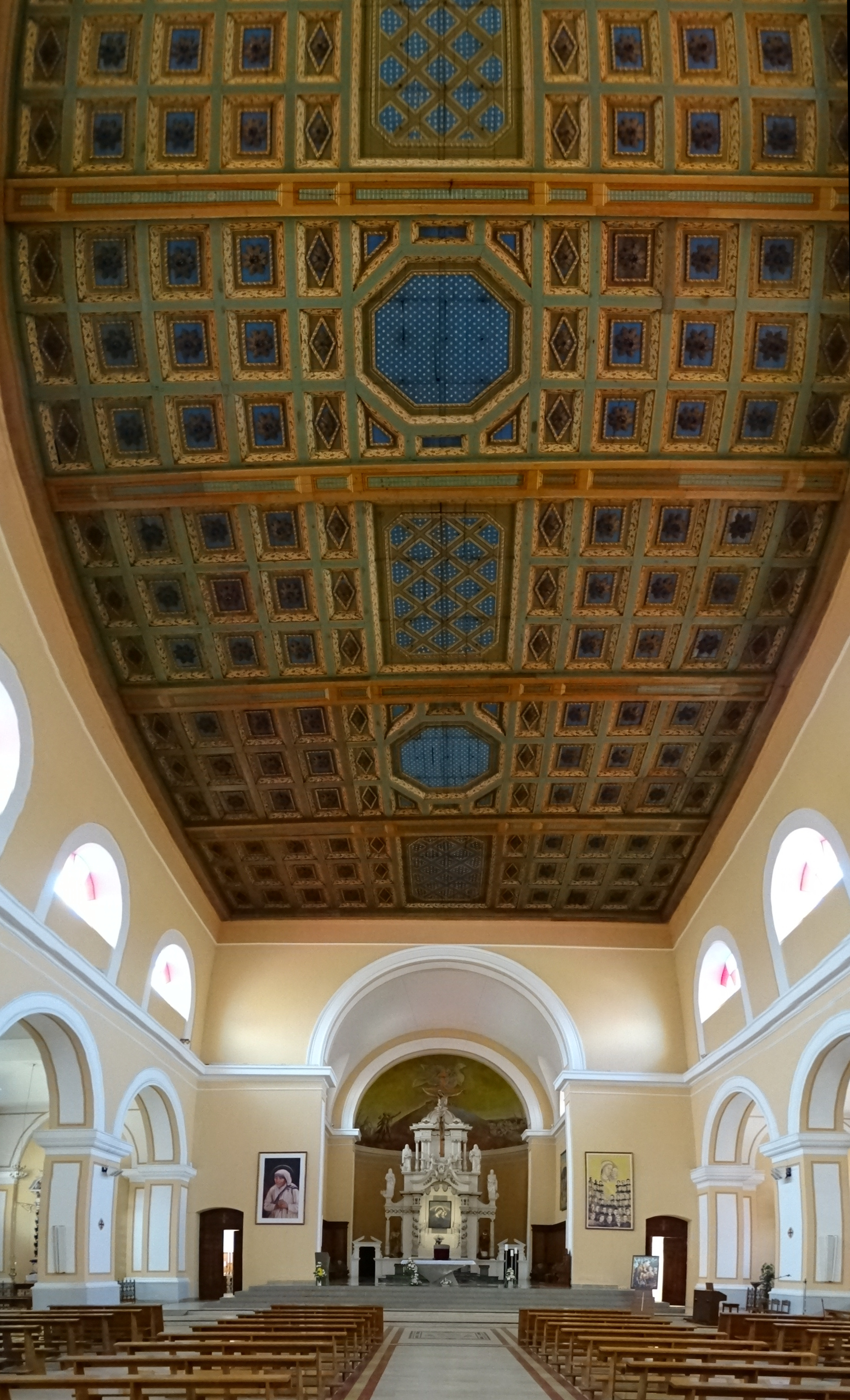
The interior of the cathedral

The land was given by mecenate Palok Krandja. Work commenced on 7 April 1858 after a major delay. There was a pompous ceremony on that day for the construction of this cathedral which would be one of the biggest Catholic cathedrals in the Balkans at that time, and many local and diplomatic personalities participated at the inauguration of the construction work. Besides giving his permission for the building through a decree, Sultan Abdülmecid I had also sent 700 Turkish liras, whereas Pope Pius IX had provided 1,000 golden scudi. The first phase of construction finished in 1867, 9 years later.

The cathedral was 74 meters long, 50 meters wide and 23.5 meters tall. Initially the main hall had a 6,000 person capacity (with people standing up).

There was a marathon for fund raising at that time: besides the contribution, which included even proceeds from sold jewelries, each Catholic family gave a worker to contribute to the construction for a period of at least 6 months. Gurash Shënkolli, a Shkodër citizen, is said to have been in Vienna during the time of the marriage of Franz Joseph I of Austria, and to have managed to enter the Emperor's office. Gurash asked the Emperor for financial aid for the construction of the church. Not only was Gurash given 150 napoleons, but he was also congratulated by the Austrian Emperor for his "typically Albanian" audacity in asking that way and to an Emperor for that type of money.

During the construction, the big arch fell twice on the ground, and the fix was made through the help of an Austrian engineer, whose name is unknown to us today. As the construction work was ending, a bell tower was still missing. Archbishop Guerini gathered the representatives of the wealthiest Catholic families. It was decided that three categories, depending on the level of wealth, would provide each 20, 15 and 10 Napoleon gold. This resulted in a dispute because many people didn't want to be ranked in lower wealth categories. At that point, Gjon Nushi, one of the wealthiest people of the community, openly proposed to Filip Parruca, another wealthy man: "Let's finish the bell tower together, and on its wall we'll have a commemorative stone to remind posterity that it was our money to build it". This discussion was enough for the community to accept rather the bishop's proposal. Filip Parruca, Mark Pema and Pjetër Pema purchased in Venice the bell, and had it put on the tower.
