= Church of Our Saviour =

Church of Our Savio(u)r or Church of the Savio(u)r, or variations thereof, may refer to:

== Albania ==
- Cathedral of Jesus Saviour of the World, Rrëshen

== Azerbaijan ==
- Church of the Saviour, Baku, presently a concert hall

== Bosnia and Herzegovina ==
- Cathedral of Christ the Saviour, Banja Luka

== Bulgaria ==
- Christ the Savior Church, Vidin

== China ==
- Church of the Saviour, Beijing

== Denmark ==
- Church of Our Saviour, Copenhagen
- Church of Our Saviour, Esbjerg

=== Greenland ===
- Church of Our Saviour (Qaqortoq)
- Nuuk Cathedral, also known as the Church of Our Saviour

== Georgia ==
- Matskhvarishi church of the Savior, Matskhvarishi, Mestia
- Speti church of the Savior, Speti, Sachkhere

== Germany ==
- Church of the Savior, Sacrow

== Greece ==
- Church of the Saviour, Thessaloniki

== Italy ==
- San Salvatore, Campi, Norcia, Umbria
- Monastery of the Holy Saviour, Lecanto, Tuscany

== Kosovo ==
- Church of Christ the Saviour, Pristina
- Church of the Holy Saviour, Prizren

== Malta ==
- Our Saviour's Church, Lija
- Chapel of Christ the Saviour, Qrendi
- Our Saviour's Chapel, Żejtun

== Poland ==
- Church of the Savior, Bydgoszcz

== Russia ==
- Cathedral of Christ the Saviour, Moscow
- Cathedral of Christ the Saviour (Kaliningrad)
- Church of Christ the Savior (Krym)
- Church of Our Savior Not Made by Hands in Serpukhov, Moscow
- Church of the Savior on Blood, St. Petersburg
- Church of the Saviour, Tyumen

== Singapore ==
- Church of Our Saviour, Singapore

== Sri Lanka ==
- Cathedral of Christ the Living Saviour

== Sweden ==
- Church of Our Saviour, Malmö

== Turkey ==
- The Chora, Istanbul

== Ukraine ==
- Church of the Saviour at Berestove, Kyiv

== United Kingdom ==
- Church of the Saviour, Birmingham, England
- Christ the Saviour Church, Ealing, England

== United States ==
- Church of Our Saviour (Placerville, California)
- Church of the Saviour (Washington, D.C.)
- Church of Our Savior (Boynton Beach, Florida)
- Church of Our Saviour (Jacksonville), Florida
- Episcopal Church of the Saviour (Clermont, Iowa)
- Church of Our Merciful Saviour (Louisville, Kentucky)
- Saint Saviour's Episcopal Church and Rectory, Bar Harbor, Maine
- Church of Our Saviour, Brookline, Massachusetts
- Church of Our Savior, Worcester, Massachusetts
- Church of Our Saviour, Friend of Children, Michigan
- Church of Our Savior (Little Falls, Minnesota)
- Church of Our Saviour (Iuka, Mississippi)
- Church of Our Most Merciful Saviour (Santee, Nebraska)
- Church of Our Saviour (New Lebanon, New York)
- Our Saviour Roman Catholic Church (Manhattan), New York
- Church of the Saviour (Syracuse, New York)
- Church of the Saviour and Cemetery, Jackson, North Carolina
- Church of Our Saviour (Cincinnati), Ohio
- Church of Our Saviour (Mechanicsburg, Ohio)
- Church of Our Saviour (Killington, Vermont)
- Church of Our Saviour, Oatlands (Leesburg, Virginia)

== See also ==
- Cathedral of Christ the Saviour (disambiguation)
- Saviour's Church (disambiguation)
- St Saviour's Church (disambiguation)
