= Cathedral of Christ the Saviour (disambiguation) =

The Cathedral of Christ the Saviour is in Moscow.

Cathedral of Christ the Saviour may also refer to:

- Cathedral of Jesus Saviour of the World, Rrëshen, Albania
- Ghazanchetsots Cathedral, Shusha, Azerbaijan
- Cathedral of Christ the Saviour (Banja Luka), Bosnia and Herzegovina
- Nuuk Cathedral, Greenland
- Church of Christ the Saviour, Pristina, Kosovo
- Cathedral of Christ the Saviour (Kaliningrad), Russia
- Cathedral of the Transfiguration of the Savior in the Wood in the Kremlin, Moscow, Russia
- Cathedral of Christ the Living Saviour, Colombo, Sri Lanka
- Cathedral of Christ the Saviour, Taichung, Taiwan
- Uzhhorod Orthodox Cathedral, Ukraine
- Cathedral of Our Merciful Saviour, Faribault, Minnesota, United States
- Cathedral of Christ the Saviour at Borki, Ukraine

== See also ==
- St Saviour's Cathedral (disambiguation)
- Church of Our Saviour (disambiguation)
- St Saviour's Church (disambiguation)
- Saviour's Church (disambiguation)
