= Saint-Sauveur =

Saint-Sauveur or St Sauveur (French for 'Holy Savior') may refer to:

== Churches ==
- Abbey of Saint-Sauveur of Sarlat, France
- Aix Cathedral (Cathédrale Saint-Sauveur d'Aix-en-Provence),
- Basilica of Saint-Sauveur (Dinan)
- Basilica of Saint-Sauveur (Rennes)
- French Church of St. Sauveur, Philadelphia, United States
- Saint Sauveur Cathedral, a Melkite Greek Catholic cathedral in Montreal, Canada
- St Saviour's Cathedral, Cayenne (Cathédrale Saint-Sauveur de Cayenne), French Guyana

== Places ==
=== Canada ===
- Saint-Sauveur, New Brunswick
- Saint-Sauveur, Quebec
- Saint-Sauveur (electoral district), a former provincial electoral district in Quebec
- Saint-Sauveur, Quebec City

=== France ===
- Saint-Sauveur, Hautes-Alpes, in the Hautes-Alpes department
- Saint-Sauveur, Côte-d'Or, in the Côte-d'Or department
- Saint-Sauveur, Dordogne, in the Dordogne department
- Saint-Sauveur, Finistère, in the Finistère department
- Saint-Sauveur, Haute-Garonne, in the Haute-Garonne department
- Saint-Sauveur, Gironde, in the Gironde department
- Saint-Sauveur, Île d'Yeu; see List of windmills in Vendée
- Saint-Sauveur, Isère, in the Isère department
- Saint-Sauveur, Meurthe-et-Moselle, in the Meurthe-et-Moselle department
- Saint-Sauveur, Oise, in the Oise department
- Saint-Sauveur, Haute-Saône, in the Haute-Saône department
- Saint-Sauveur, Somme, in the Somme department
- Saint-Sauveur, Vienne, in the Vienne department
- Saint-Sauveur-Camprieu, in the Gard department
- Saint-Sauveur-d'Aunis, in the Charente-Maritime department
- Saint-Sauveur-de-Carrouges, in the Orne department
- Saint-Sauveur-de-Cruzières, in the Ardèche department
- Saint-Sauveur-de-Flée, in the Maine-et-Loire department
- Saint-Sauveur-de-Ginestoux, in the Lozère department
- Saint-Sauveur-de-Landemont, in the Maine-et-Loire department
- Saint-Sauveur-d'Émalleville, in the Seine-Maritime department
- Saint-Sauveur-de-Meilhan, in the Lot-et-Garonne department
- Saint-Sauveur-de-Montagut, in the Ardèche department
- Saint-Sauveur-de-Peyre, in the Lozère department
- Saint-Sauveur-de-Pierrepont, in the Manche department
- Saint-Sauveur-de-Puynormand, in the Gironde department
- Saint-Sauveur-des-Landes, in the Ille-et-Vilaine department
- Saint-Sauveur-en-Diois, in the Drôme department
- Saint-Sauveur-en-Puisaye, in the Yonne department
- Saint-Sauveur-en-Rue, in the Loire department
- Saint-Sauveur-Gouvernet, in the Drôme department
- Saint-Sauveur-Lalande, in the Dordogne department
- Saint-Sauveur-la-Pommeraye, in the Manche department
- Saint-Sauveur-la-Sagne, in the Puy-de-Dôme department
- Saint-Sauveur-la-Vallée, in the Lot department
- Saint-Sauveur-Lendelin, in the Manche department
- Saint-Sauveur-lès-Bray, in the Seine-et-Marne department
- Saint-Sauveur-le-Vicomte, in the Manche department
- Saint-Sauveur-Marville, in the Eure-et-Loir department
- Saint-Sauveur-sur-École, in the Seine-et-Marne department
- Saint-Sauveur-sur-Tinée, in the Alpes-Maritimes department
- Quartier Saint-Sauveur, a quarter of the city of Lille

=== Elsewhere ===
- Saint Sauveur, Dominica, a village in the Commonwealth of Dominica
- Saint-Sauveur, Wallonia, a district in Frasnes-lez-Anvaing, Hainaut, Belgium
- Saint-Sauveur, a commune of Guernsey

== Other ==
- Lille-Saint-Sauveur station, now repurposed
- Saint-Sauveur, a medieval monastery and unidentified castle and lordship in Messenia, Greece
- Melkite Greek Catholic Eparchy of Saint-Sauveur of Montréal, a Melkite Greek Catholic eparchy in Canada

== See also ==
- Saint Savior (disambiguation)
- San Salvador (disambiguation)
- Sauveur (disambiguation)
- St Saviour's Cathedral (disambiguation)
