= Saint Saviour =

Saint Saviour may refer to:

- Jesus as Saviour (Sanctus Salvator), a Latin dedication of churches, more often translated into English as "Holy Saviour"

== Places ==
- Saint Saviour, Guernsey, a parish in Guernsey
- Saint Saviour, Jersey, a parish in Jersey
- St Saviour's Dock, a dock in London, England
- Monastery of Saint Saviour, a monastery in Jerusalem

== Schools ==
- St Saviour's and St Olave's Church of England School, Southwark, London, England
- St Saviour's Grammar School, one of its predecessors
- Saint Saviour High School of Brooklyn, New York

== People ==
- Saint Saviour (musician), British singer

== See also ==
- St Saviour's Church (disambiguation)
- St Saviour Cathedral (disambiguation)
- San Salvador (disambiguation), the Spanish equivalent
- Saint-Sauveur (disambiguation), the French equivalent
- St Salvator's College, St Andrews, Scotland
