= Rrëshen =

- Administrative unit
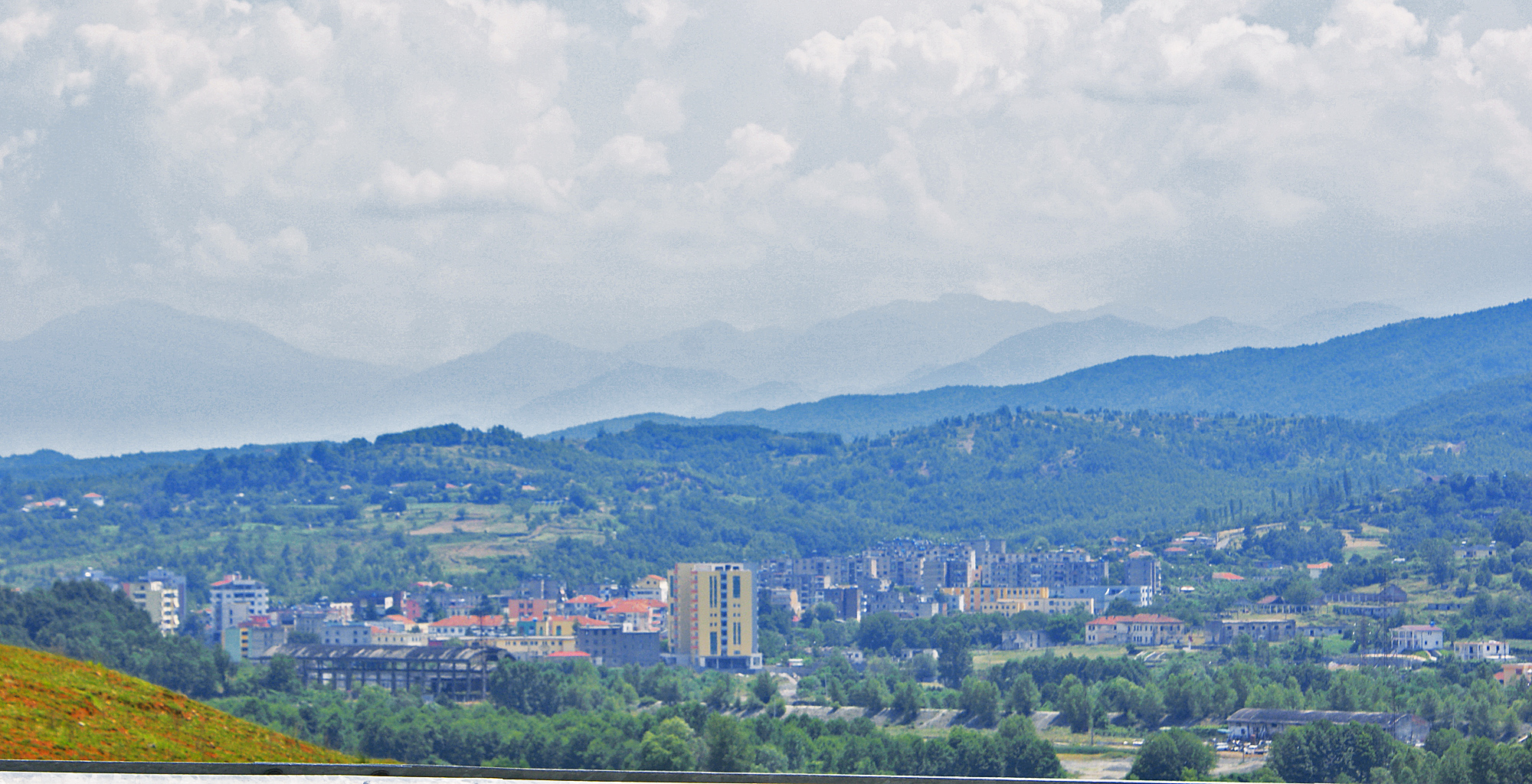

- Location within Albania
- Coordinates: 41°46′N 19°53′E
- Country: Albania
- County: Lezhë
- Municipality: Mirditë
  - Administrative unit: 120 km^{2} (46 sq mi)
- Elevation: 90 m (300 ft)

Population (2023)
  - Administrative unit: 6,773
  - Administrative unit density: 56/km^{2} (150/sq mi)
- Time zone: UTC+1 (CET)
  - Summer (DST): UTC+2 (CEST)
- Postal Code: 4601, 4602
- Area Code: 0216
- Website: www.bashkiarreshen.com

Rrëshen (Albanian definite form: Rrësheni) is a small town and a former municipality in Lezhë County, in northern Albania. At the 2015 local government reform, Rrëshen became a subdivision and the seat of the municipality Mirditë. It was the administrative seat of the former Mirditë District. The population at the 2023 census was 6,773.

== The City ==
As an administrative seat, the town has schools and a hospital. After the Communist era, new facilities such as a hotel, a restaurant, and a cultural centre appeared in the area. The truck route from the Kosovar border to Tirana and Durrës passes on each side of Rrëshen, providing good communications with the capital and the Adriatic. Before the Second World War, the city was classed as a small village, but administrative changes and an increase in the mining industry boosted the city's status. However, since the fall of Communism, most of the mines have become disused. This has resulted in mass migration to Tirana and larger, more industrial centres.

== Religion ==
Its cathedral, Katedralja e Jezusi i Vetmi Shpëtimtar i Botës, is the episcopal see of the Roman Catholic Diocese of Rrëshen, which was created in 1996 by promoting the Territorial Abbacy of Shën Llezhri i Oroshit from Territorial Abbey to a bishopric. It is a suffragan diocese in the province of the Metropolitan Roman Catholic Archdiocese of Tiranë–Durrës.

== Gallery ==
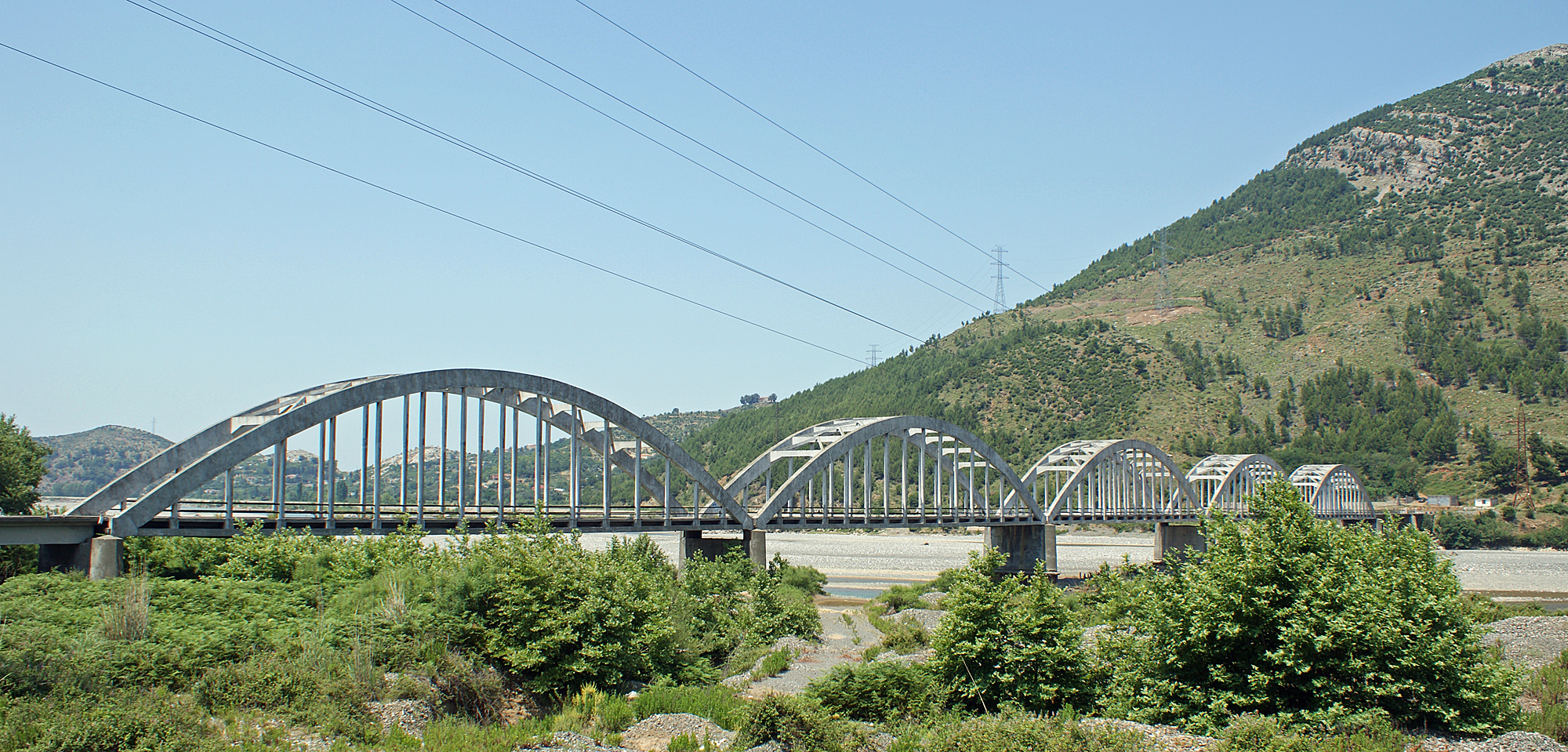
Zogu Bridge

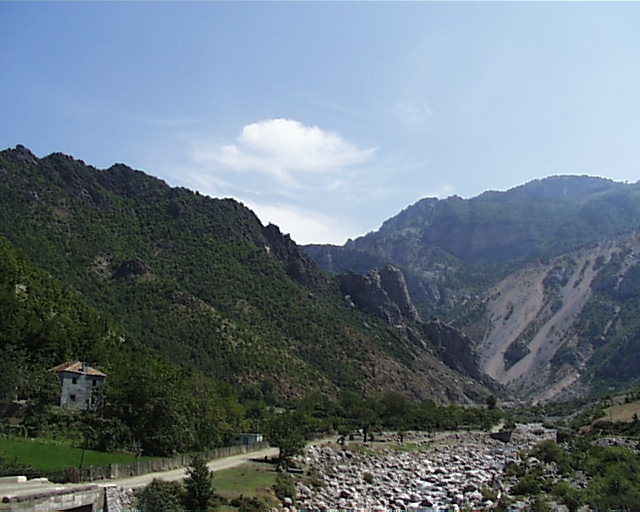
Fan River Canyon

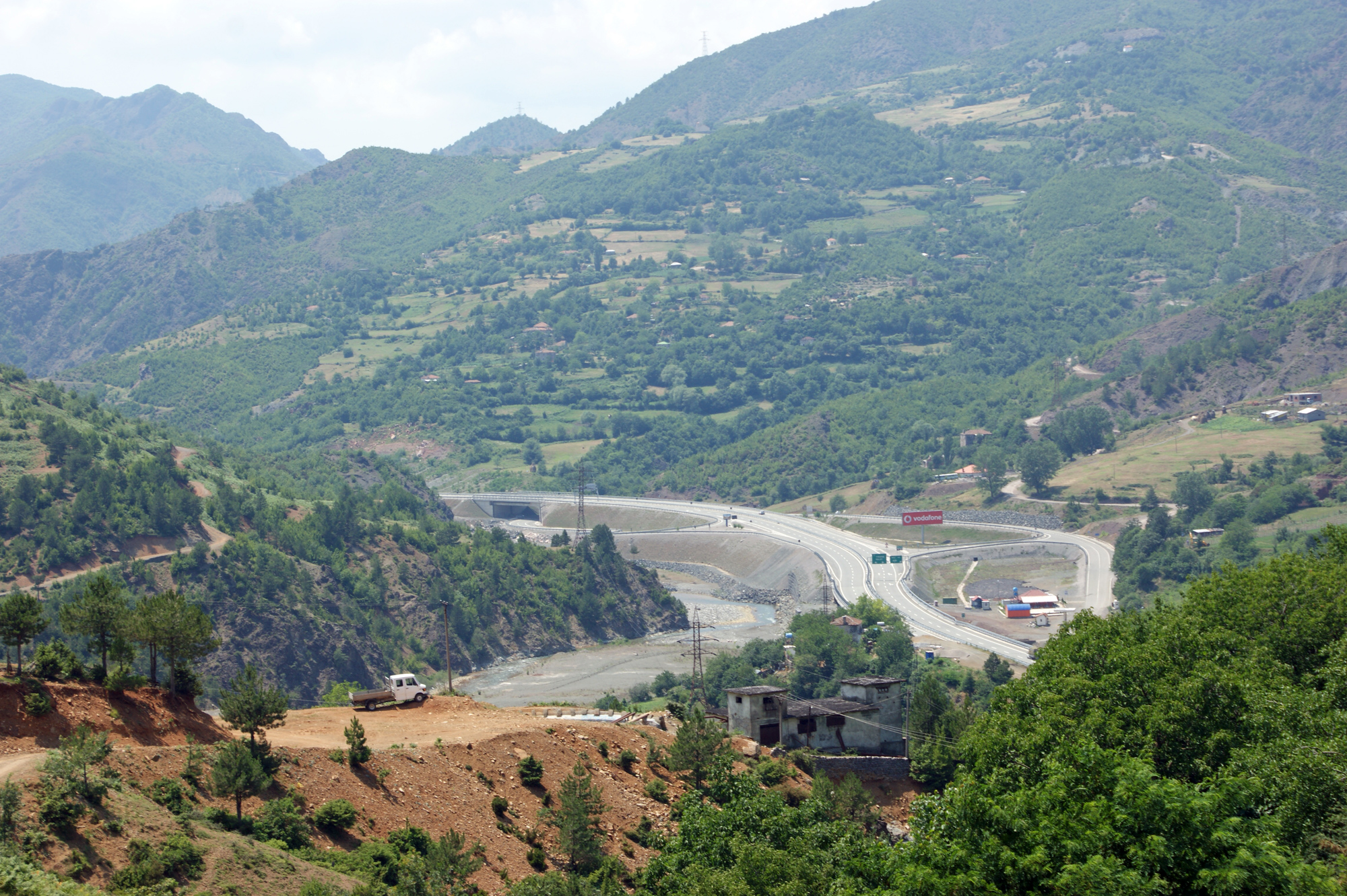
Fan Valley in Reps

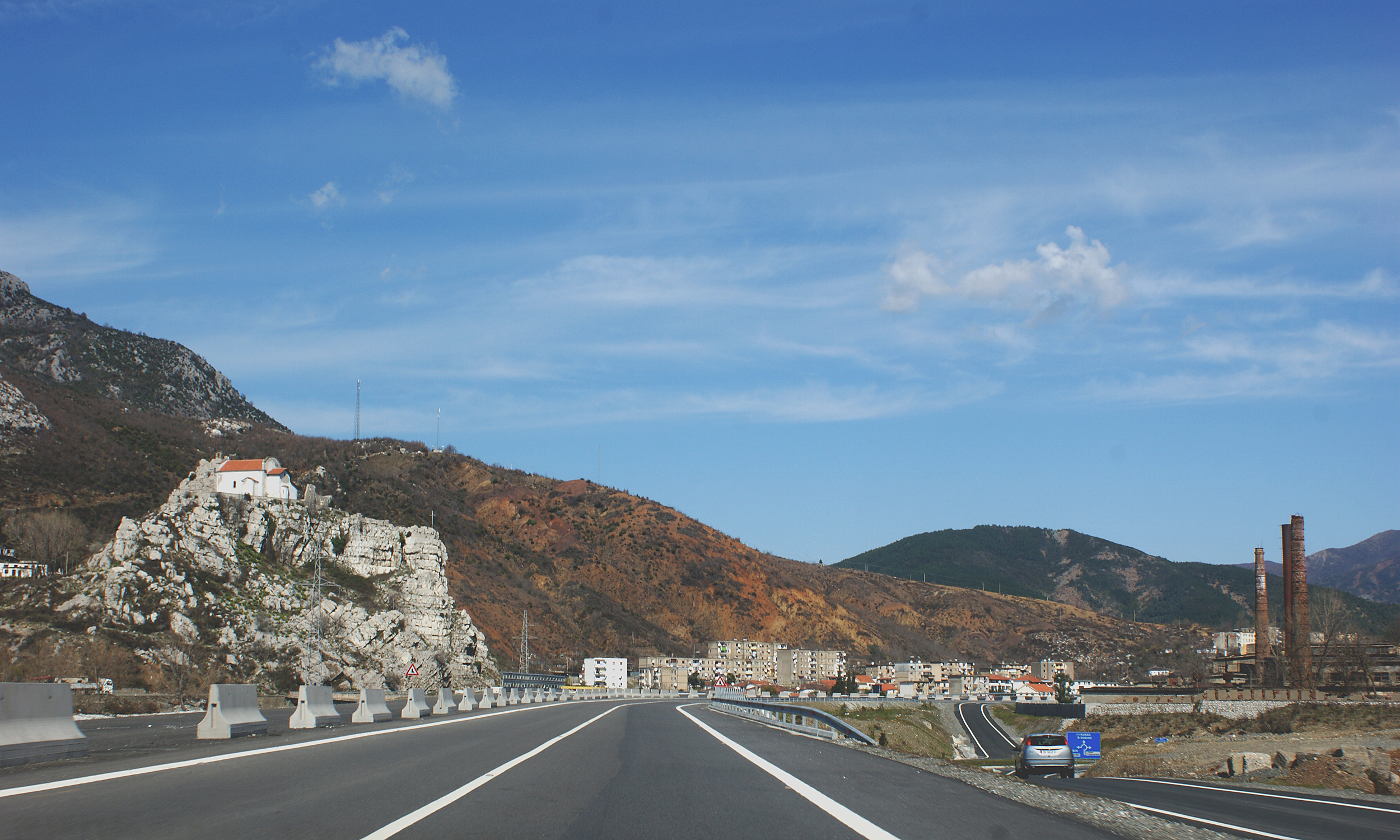
Rubik Church on top left along A1 Highway

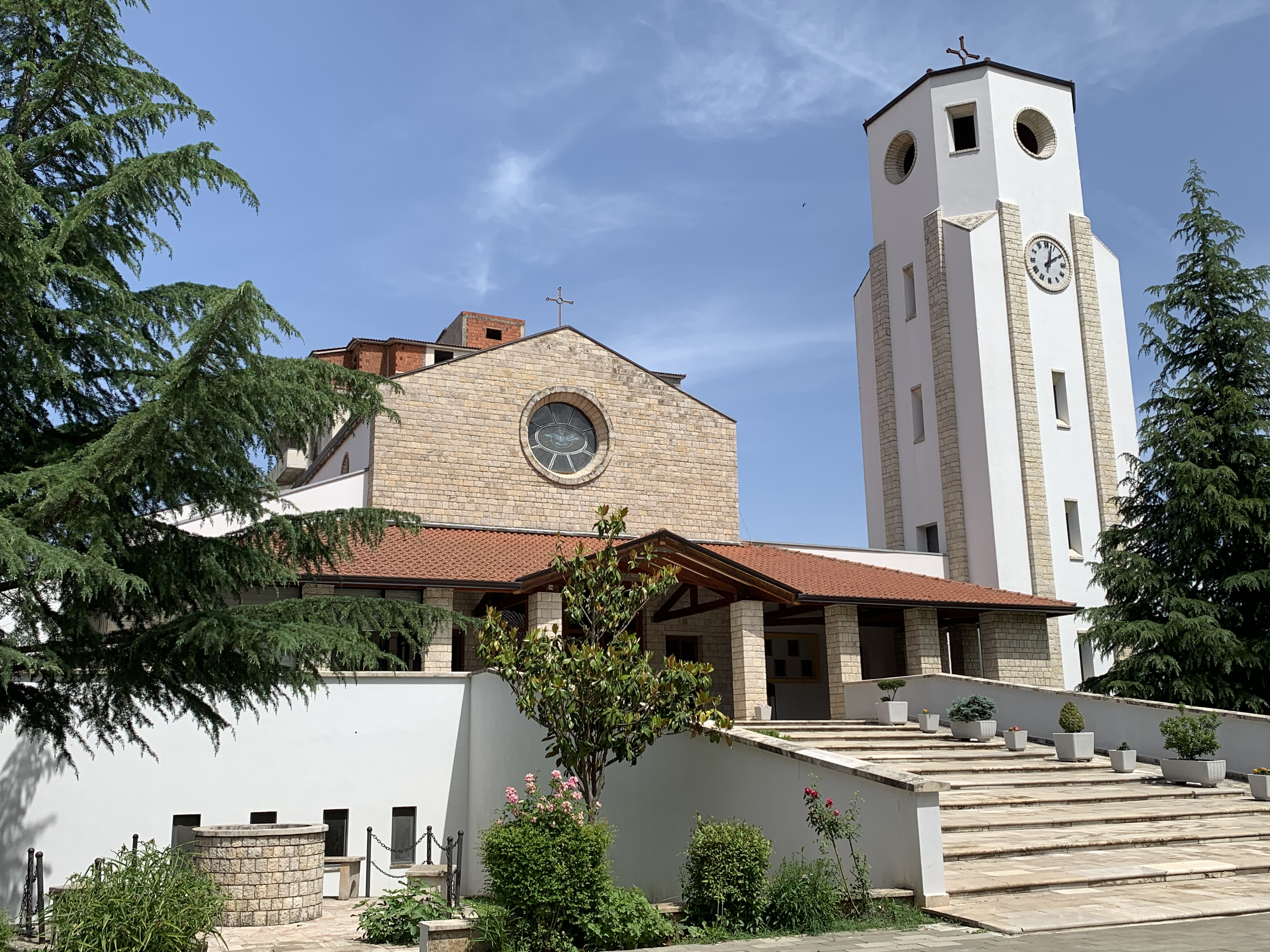
Rrëshen church

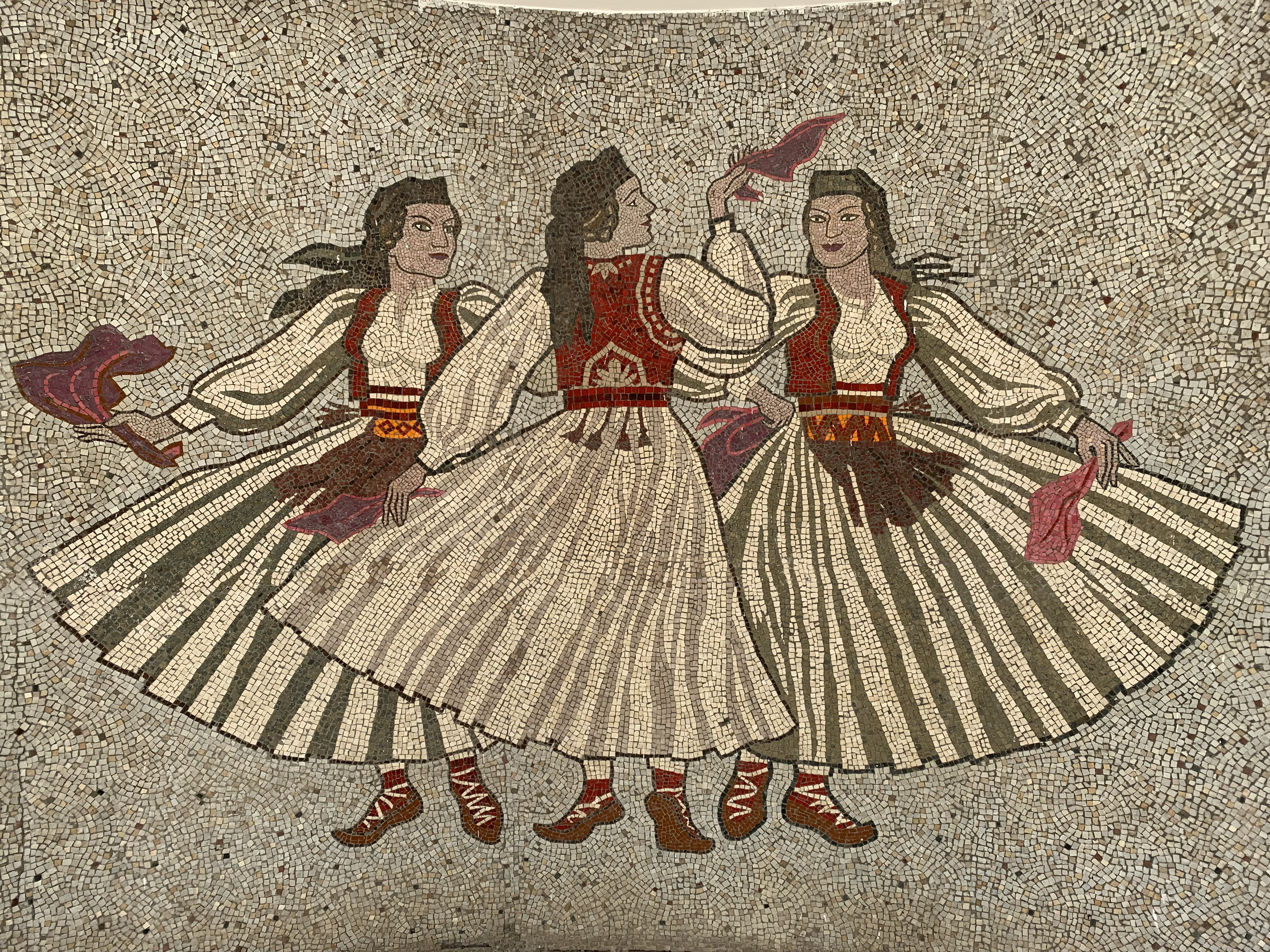
Mosaic in Rrëshen

== Notable people ==
- Eugent Bushpepa (born 1984), singer and songwriter
- Musine Kokalari (born 1917), writer and political activist
- Albion Marku (born 2000), footballer
- Edison Ndreca (born 1994), footballer
- Fatmir Vata (born 1979), footballer

== Sources and external links ==
- Rrëshen Municipality
- Mirdita Tourism Portal
- Albanian Census Figures
- GigaCatholic
