= Church of the Holy Trinity, Banja Luka =

Serbian Orthodox church in Banja Luka, Bosnia and Herzegovina

Church of the Holy Trinity
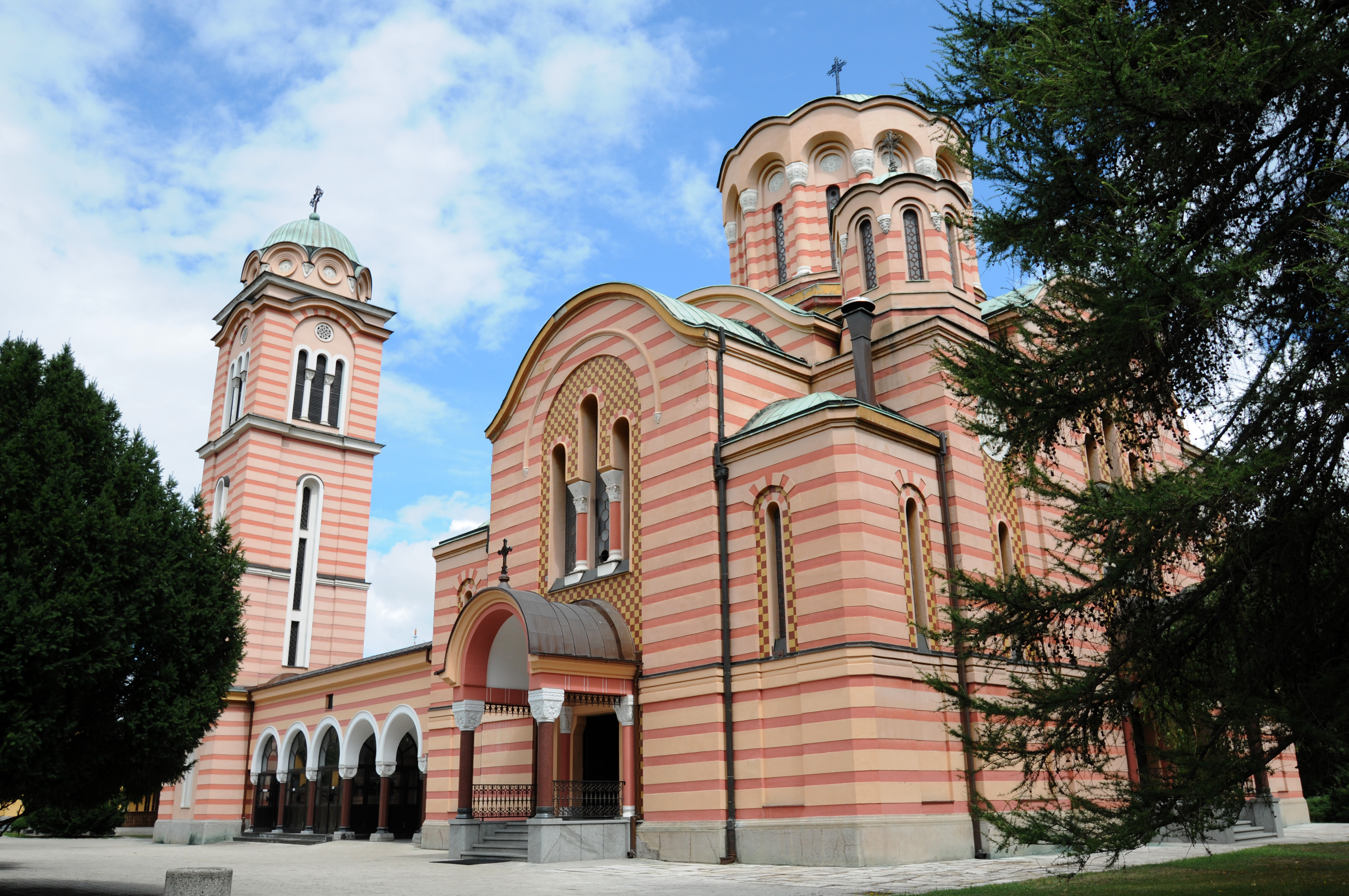
- Church of Holy Trinity
- Church of the Holy Trinity
- 44°46′28″N 17°11′46″E
- Country: Bosnia and Herzegovina
- Denomination: Serbian Orthodox Church

History
- Dedication: Holy Trinity

Architecture
- Completed: 1969

Administration
- Archdiocese: Eparchy of Banja Luka

The Church of the Holy Trinity (Serbian: Саборна црква Свете Тројице) is a Serbian Orthodox church located in Banja Luka, de facto capital of the Republika Srpska in Bosnia and Herzegovina. Dedicated to Holy Trinity, it was constructed in 1969. The Bishop's Palace of the Eparchy of Banja Luka is located in the church courtyard. The church was the central Serbian Orthodox religious building in the city from its construction during the existence of the Socialist Republic of Bosnia and Herzegovina until the construction of the Cathedral of Christ the Saviour.

== History ==
Following the end of World War II in Yugoslavia, the authorities of the Socialist Republic of Bosnia and Herzegovina prevented the reconstruction of the original destroyed Church of the Holy Trinity in central Banja Luka. Instead, a Monument to the Fallen Fighters was erected on the site. The construction of a new church bearing the same name and resembling the old one was initiated at the new location. Emigree priest Branko Kusonjić coordinated donation of 25.000 US Dolar for the construction of the new church in 1956. The foundations of the new church were consecrated on 25 November 1962. The first liturgy in the church was celebrated on the feast day of Saint Ignatius on 2 January 1967. The formal consecration of the church took place on 16 July 1972. Between 1972 and 2009, it served as the cathedral church of the Eparchy of Banja Luka.

== See also ==
- Eparchy of Banja Luka
