= Speti church of the Savior =

Church in Georgia

- სპეთის მაცხოვრის სახელობის ეკლესია
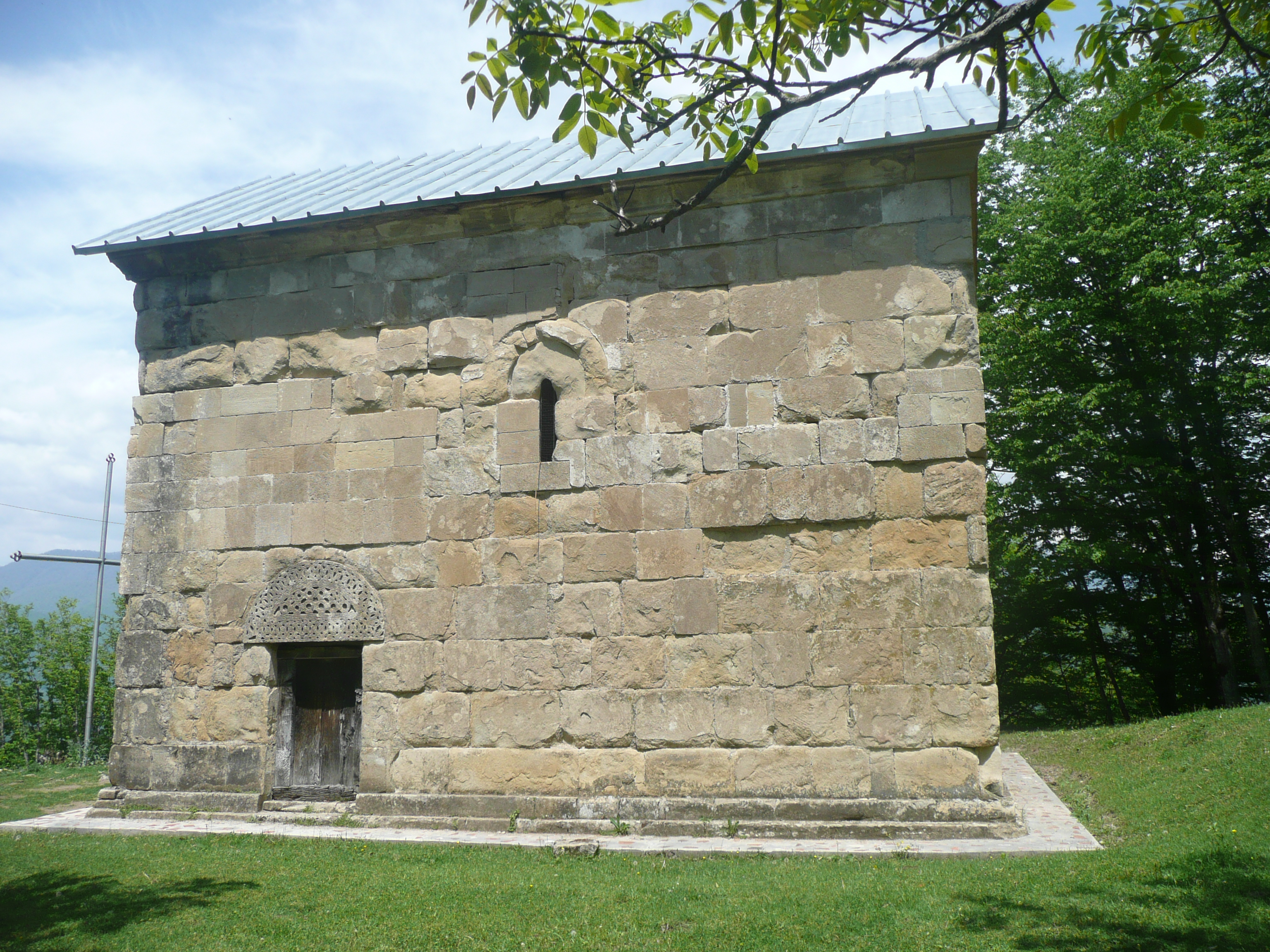
- Speti church of the Savior
- Interactive map of Speti church of the Savior
- Location: Speti, Sachkhere Municipality; Imereti, Georgia
- Coordinates: 42.322778°N 43.470556°E
- Type: Single-nave hall church

The Speti church of the Savior (Georgian: სპეთის მაცხოვრის სახელობის ეკლესია, romanized: sp'etis matskhovris sakhelobis ek'lesia) is an 11th-century Georgian Orthodox church in the western Georgian region of Imereti. It is a single-nave hall church, its most recognizable feature being a medieval ornate iconostasis made of alabaster and stucco. The church is inscribed on the list of Georgia's Immovable Cultural Monuments of National Significance.

== History ==
The Speti church of the Savior is perched atop a high Mount Kvirike near the village of Speti, in the Qvirila River valley, 16 km east of the town of Sachkhere, in the Sachkhere Municipality, Imereti region. The church is commonly known as the Upper Church of the Savior (ზედამაცხოვარი, zedamatskhovari) to distinguish it from its namesake late-medieval "lower" church, situated down in the village. The church was half-ruined when Ekvtime Taqaishvili visited it in 1920. It was substantially repaired in 1938.

== Layout ==
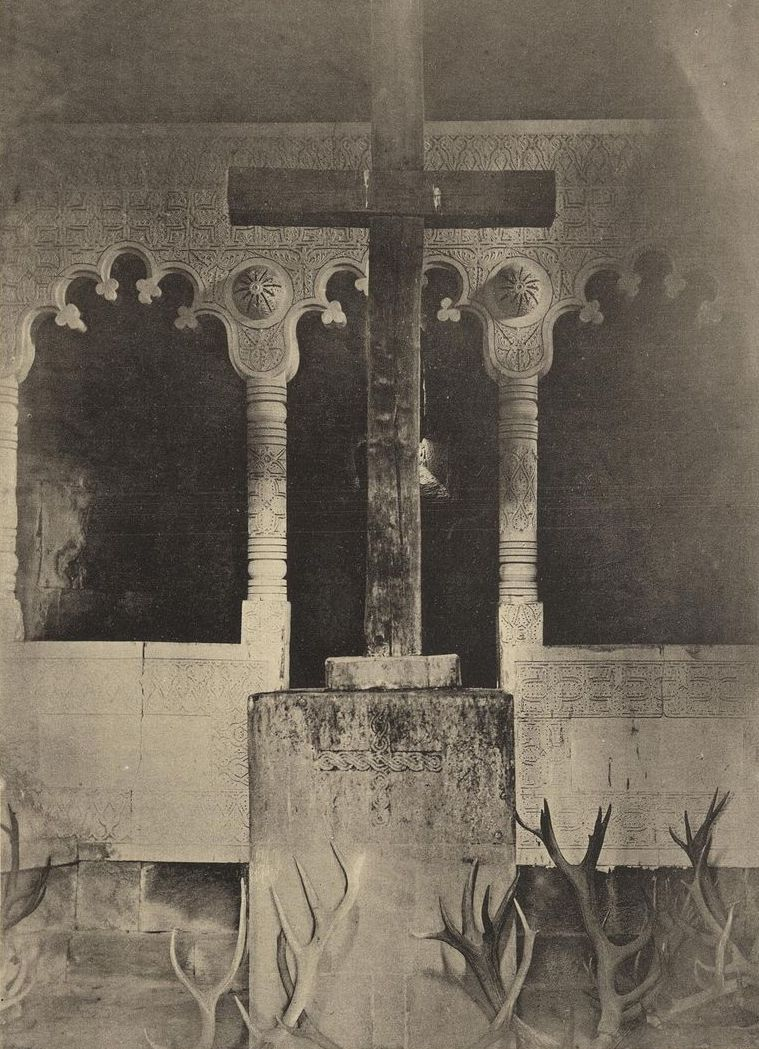
The Speti iconostasis with a wooden cross and deer horns before it. Published in 1898.

The church is built of large hewn sandstone slabs. It is a small single-nave hall church, with a semicircular apse inscribed in the outer rectangle. The construction of the main apse is similar to that at the Ekhvevi church. It had doors on the south and west, but the southern one is now filled up; its carved archivolt has been preserved. There is one window on the south and one on the west, but here the carved ornamentation is damaged. On either side of the east window are seen barely discernible traces of two inscriptions in the medieval Georgian asomtavruli letters.

The interior is covered with barrel vaulting, on three supporting arches, and the wall is divided longitudinally into flank arcades. Below there is a small niche at each side of the apse, while higher up are large recesses which, on the east, open outwards in circular apertures, with carved casting. These recesses correspond to the prothesis and diakonikon. The church has preserved its high iconostasis, which is contemporaneous with the church and has been removed to the Georgian National Museum in Tbilisi for safekeeping. It is covered with grass ornamentation, but the colors have faded, owing to the moisture. The iconostasis is built of alabaster-stucco, and consists of three arches and four pillars, with a royal door in the middle. In front of the royal doors, on a rectangular stone pedestal, stands a massive wooden cross, once covered with sheets of silver, but now bare. The church was greatly revered by hunters and many deers' horns used to be displayed in the building.
