= St Saviour's Church =

St Saviour's Church, St. Savior's Church, Church of St Saviour, or variants thereof may refer to:

== Albania ==
- St. Saviour's Church, Herebel
- St Saviour's Church, Kërçishti i Epërm
- St. Saviour's Church, Tremishtë
- St. Saviour's Church, Vuno

== Australia ==
- St Saviour's Anglican Church, South Johnstone, Cassowary Coast Region, Queensland
- St Saviour's Cathedral, Goulburn
- St Saviour's Church, former name of Sacred Heart Church, Hindmarsh, Adelaide

== Canada ==
- St. Saviour's Anglican Church (Barkerville, British Columbia)
- St. Saviour's Anglican Church (Orono, Ontario)

== Croatia ==
- St. Saviour Church, Dubrovnik

== France ==
- Vabres Cathedral (French: Cathédrale Saint-Sauveur-et-Saint-Pierre de Vabres), a former cathedral now used as a church

== Ireland ==
- St Saviour’s Priory, Dublin

== Latvia ==
- St. Saviour's Church, Riga

== Kosovo ==
- St Saviour's Church, Prizren

== Macedonia ==
- St Saviour's Church, Skopje

== New Zealand ==
- St Saviour's Chapel, Christchurch

== Turkey ==
- Chora Church, Istanbul, dedicated to St Saviour

== United Kingdom ==
- Southwark Cathedral, formally called the Cathedral and Collegiate Church of St Saviour and St Mary Overie, London
- St Saviour's Church for the Deaf, now St Thomas Cathedral, Acton, London
- St Saviour's Church, Astley Bridge, Greater Manchester
- St Saviour's Church, Aughton, Lancashire
- Bermondsey Abbey, London, dedicated to St Saviour
- St Saviour's Church, Bath, Somerset
- St Saviour's Church, Branston, Staffordshire
- St Saviour's Church, Chorlton on Medlock, Manchester
- St Saviour's Church, Cuerden, Lancashire
- St Saviour's Church, Eastbourne, East Sussex
- St Saviour's Church, Forest Gate, east London
- St Saviour's Church, Hampstead, London
- St Saviour's Church, Harome, North Yorkshire
- St Saviour's Church, Hockley, Birmingham
- St Saviour's Church, Leicester
- St Saviour's Church, Lewisham
- St Saviour's Church, Norwich
- St Saviours in the Meadows, Nottingham, Nottinghamshire
- St Saviour's Church, Oxton, Merseyside
- St Saviour, Pimlico, London
- St Saviour's Church, Puxton, Somerset
- St Saviour's Church, Retford, Nottinghamshire
- St Saviour Church, Richmond Hill, Leeds, West Yorkshire
- St Saviour's Church, Ringley, Greater Manchester
- St Saviour's Church, Saltley, Birmingham
- St Saviour's Church, Scarborough, North Yorkshire
- Church of St Saviour-on-the-Cliff, Shanklin, Isle of Wight
- St Saviour's Church, Shotton Colliery, County Durham; see Thomas Frederick Hardwich
- St Saviour's Church, now Southwark Cathedral, London
- St Saviour's Church, Splott, Cardiff
- St Saviour's Church, Stydd, Lancashire
- St Saviour's Church, Tetbury, Gloucestershire
- St Saviour's, Walmer, Kent
- St Saviour's Church, Wildboarclough, Cheshire
- St Saviour's Church, York

== United States ==
- Saint Saviour's Episcopal Church and Rectory, Maine

== See also ==
- St Saviour's Cathedral (disambiguation)
- Church of Our Saviour (disambiguation)
- Saviour's Church (disambiguation)
