= Sauveur =

Sauveur is French for "savior" and is also a family name.

Sauveur may refer to:

== Saint Savour ==
- Saint-Sauveur (disambiguation)

== As a name ==
- Albert Sauveur (1863–1939), American metallurgist
- Joseph Sauveur (1653–1716), French mathematician
- Rich Sauveur (born 1963), American baseball player
