= Church of Christ the Savior (Krym) =

Church in Rostov Oblast, Russia

- Церковь Всеспасителя (Russian); Սուրբ Ամենափրկիչ եկեղեցի (Armenian)
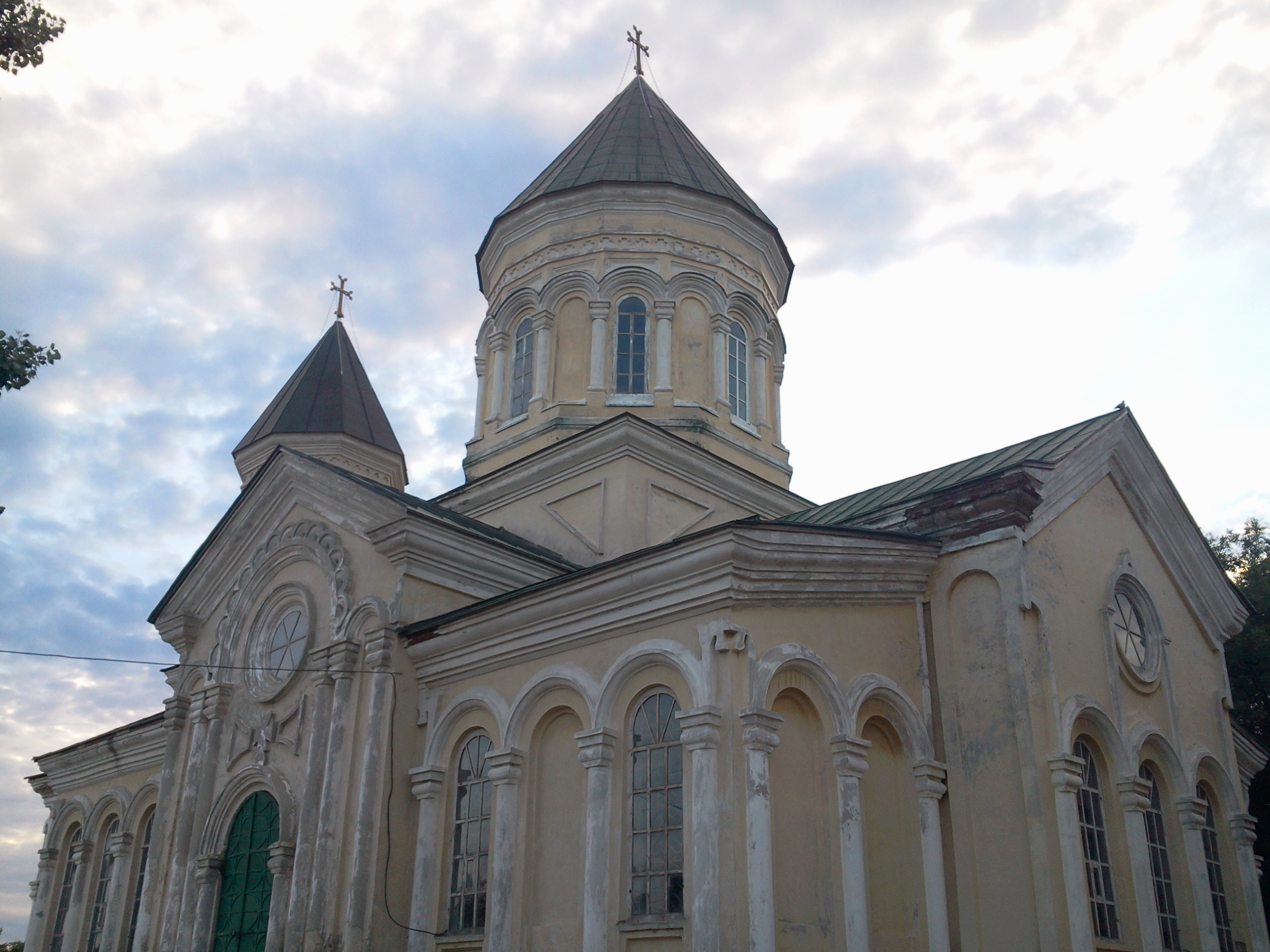
- Church of Christ the Savior
- 47°18′17″N 39°30′38″E
- Location: Krym village, Myasnikovsky District, Rostov Oblast, Russia
- Country: Russia
- Denomination: Armenian Apostolic Church

History
- Status: Parish church
- Dedication: Christ the Savior

Administration
- Diocese: Russia and New Nakhichevan

The Church of Christ the Savior (Russian: Церковь Всеспасителя; Armenian: Սուրբ Ամենափրկիչ եկեղեցի) is an Armenian Apostolic church in Krym village, Myasnikovsky District, Rostov Oblast, Russia. It is also officially declared as an architectural monument of regional significance of cultural heritage of Russia.

== History ==
August 23, 1895 the construction of the Church of Christ the Savior in Krym village was approved by the decree of Emperor Nicholas II. The construction works were finished in 1902.

In 1930s the church was closed on decision of local authorities.

During World War II and German occupation of the region, divine services continued there again. Yet already in 1960, Soviet authorities once again decided to close the church and use its premises as a workshop. Later the church building was turned into granary.

In 1982 the building was renovated, in 1996 it was consecrated and opened again. Now it is also officially declared as an architectural monument of regional significance of cultural heritage of Russia.

== Architecture ==
The church was built in the style of Armenian architecture.

The bell tower has a form of the square. The side rooms adjoining the bell tower are elevated to the level of church's corner offices.
