= Saviour's Church =

Saviour's Church may refer to:

- Saviour Church, Moscow Kremlin
- Church of the Savior on Blood, a Russian Orthodox church in St. Petersburg, Russia
- Saviour Church on Sennaya Square, a Russian Orthodox church in St. Petersburg, Russia
- Saviour's Church, Baku, a Lutheran church in Baku, Azerbaijan

== See also ==
- Church of Our Saviour (disambiguation)
- St Saviour's Church
