= Chapel of Christ the Saviour, Qrendi =

Chapel of Our Saviour
- The Church of the Transfuguaration of Jesus
- Il-Kappella ts-Salvatur
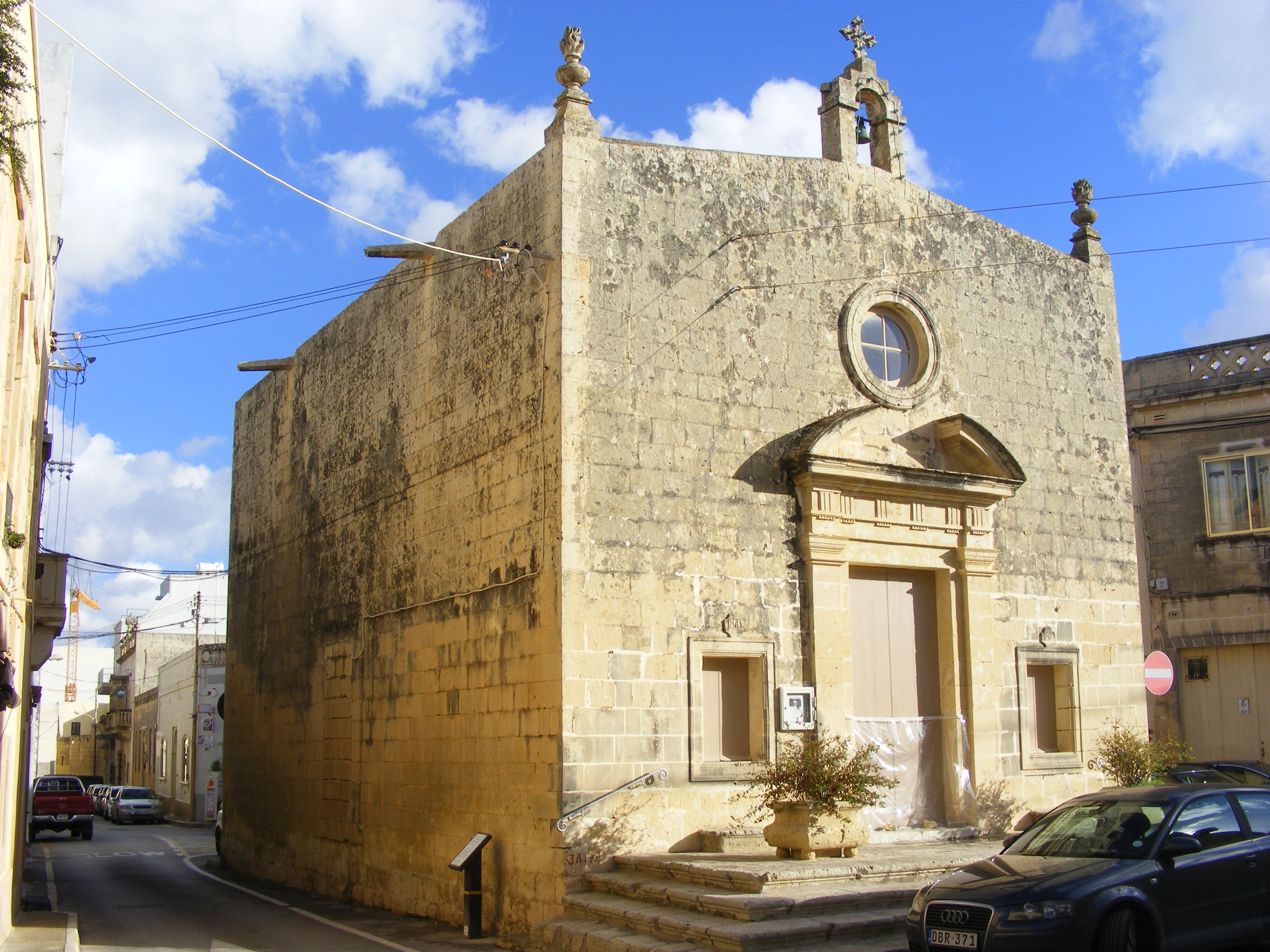

- 35°50′09.1″N 14°27′35.1″E
- Location: Qrendi
- Country: Malta
- Denomination: Roman Catholic

History
- Status: Chapel
- Dedication: Transfiguration of Jesus

Architecture
- Functional status: Active

Administration
- Archdiocese: Malta
- Parish: Qrendi

The Chapel of the Transfiguration of Jesus or simply known as Our Saviour's or Tas-Salvatur is a Roman Catholic chapel located in the village of Qrendi in the south of Malta.

== History ==
This chapel is first mentioned in Pietro Dusina's report of his apostolic visit to Malta in 1575. Dusina visited the chapel on 9 February 1575, the first chapel he visited in Qrendi. Dusina mentions that the church had one altar but lacked any other objects necessary for services, including a rector and an income. However, Vincentius Aquilina, a nearby resident used to organise a service and vespers on the feast day.

In 1618 the Bishop of Malta Baldassare Cagliares visited the church and mentions that it had an altar, a bell and a cemetery. Bishop Cagliares visited the church again in 1621. In 1636, his successor Miguel Juan Balaguer Camarasa visited the church as well and found it in the same condition as Bishop Cagliares describes. Some years later the same bishop, during an apostolic visit to the village (1656–1659) mentions that the chapel of Our Saviour as a new building, indicating that the original medieval chapel was demolished when a new one was built instead. In fact the present church was built in 1658 by Beneditto Camilleri.

In the 1960s the church was used as a parish hall. It was fully restored back to its original appearance and use in 1997, both internally and externally.

== Interior ==
The chapel ceiling is beautifully painted with floral designs, restored in 1997. The chapel has one altar which may have been installed in 1876. Above the main door there is a balcony adorned with pillars with the date 1876 sculpted on them, indicating when the gallery was built. The chapel lacks a titular painting however in the 17th and 1?th century, respectively, two different painting adorned the altar however no one knows what happened to these paintings.
