= Ekhvevi church =

Church in Georgia

Ekhvevi church of the Mother of God
- ეხვევის ღვთისმშობლის ეკლესია
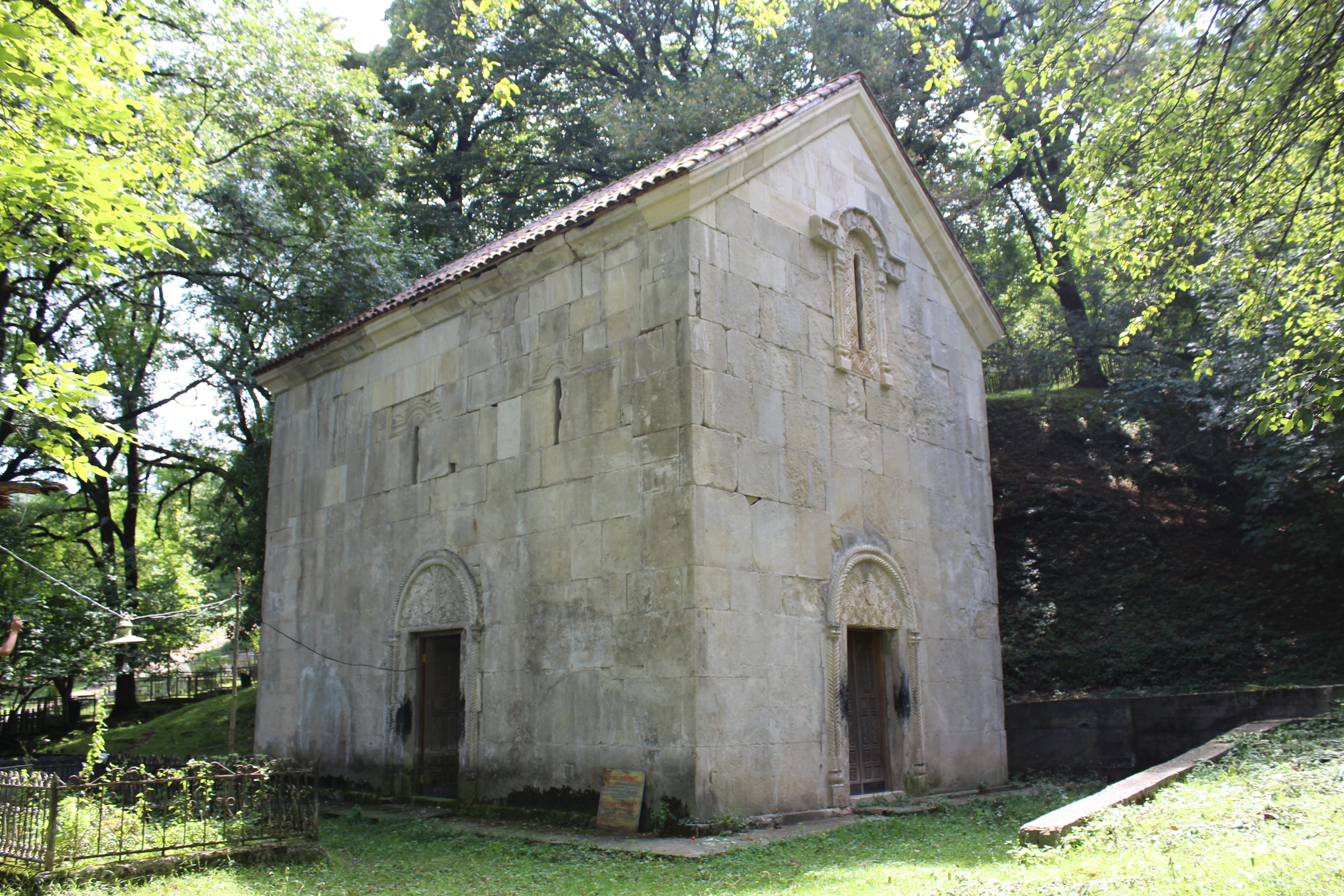
- Ekhvevi church
- Interactive map of Ekhvevi church of the Mother of God
- Location: Eto-Ekhvevi, Sachkhere Municipality; Imereti, Georgia
- Coordinates: 42.305556°N 43.508889°E
- Type: Single-nave basilica

The Ekhvevi church of the Mother of God (Georgian: ეხვევის ღვთისმშობლის ეკლესია, romanized: ekhvevis ghvtismshoblis ek'lesia) is an 11th-century Georgian Orthodox church in the western Georgian region of Imereti. A single-nave basilica, the church is known for carved masonry ornamentation on the exterior façades. The church is inscribed on the list of Georgia's Immovable Cultural Monuments of National Significance.

== Layout ==
The Ekhvevi church stands on a mountain slope at the village of Eto-Ekhvevi, in the Qvirila River valley, 10 km east of the town of Sachkhere, in the Sachkhere Municipality, Imereti region. The church is a small, one-aisled basilica, dedicated to the Mother of God. It is built of large hewn stones. The church had chapels (eukterion) on the north and west, still extant in 1897; when Ekvtime Taqaishvili visited the church in 1920, they had been lost to reconstruction projects.

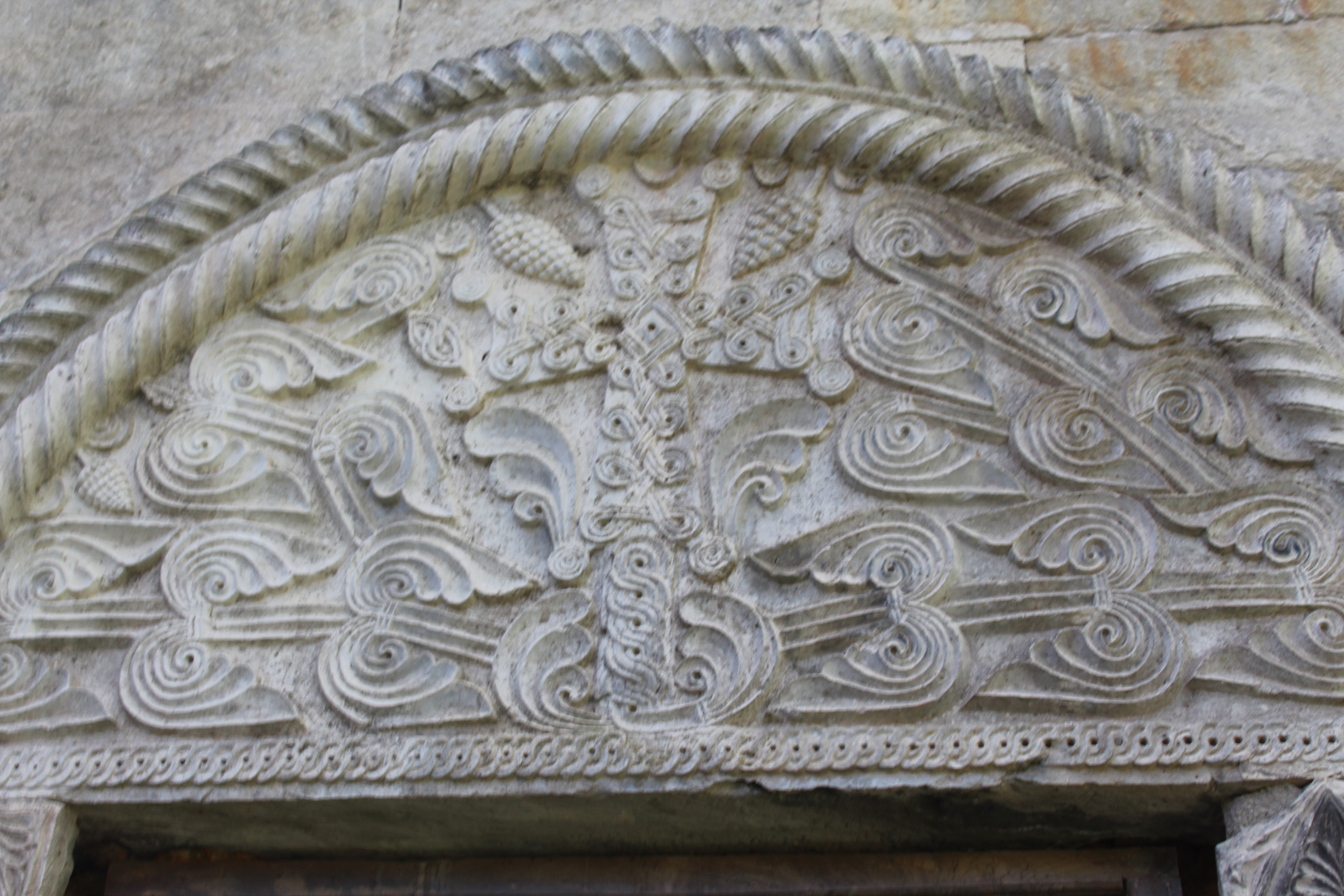
Ekhvevi church. The northern tympanum.

In the apse, on each side of each of the windows, there is a small niche, and above the niches there are large deep recesses on two levels. The lower levels open outwards on the east by small oblong narrow windows, with simply-carved archivolts. The upper storeys of the recesses serve as sacraria and have small, round apertures. The lower storey communicates with the upper storey by means of a square opening, covered by a removable stone slab. The barrel-vaulted roof of the church is supported on three arches.

The iconostasis, as is evident from its remnants was of marble, with a royal door in the middle. The other marble slabs of it were removed by the metropolitan David to the Jruchi monastery in the 1830s. The façades bear rich ornamented stonework. Of note are the decorated tympani of the north and west doors as well as window frames, adorned with interlaced patterns, and double-plaited colonettes on the west and east façades. On the base of the left colonette of the eastern window there is an inscription, in the medieval Georgian asomtavruli script, which contains an abbreviated name of the possible builder of the church.
