= Christ the Savior Church, Vidin =

Catholic church in Vidin, Bulgaria

Coordinates: 43°57′15″N 22°51′09″E

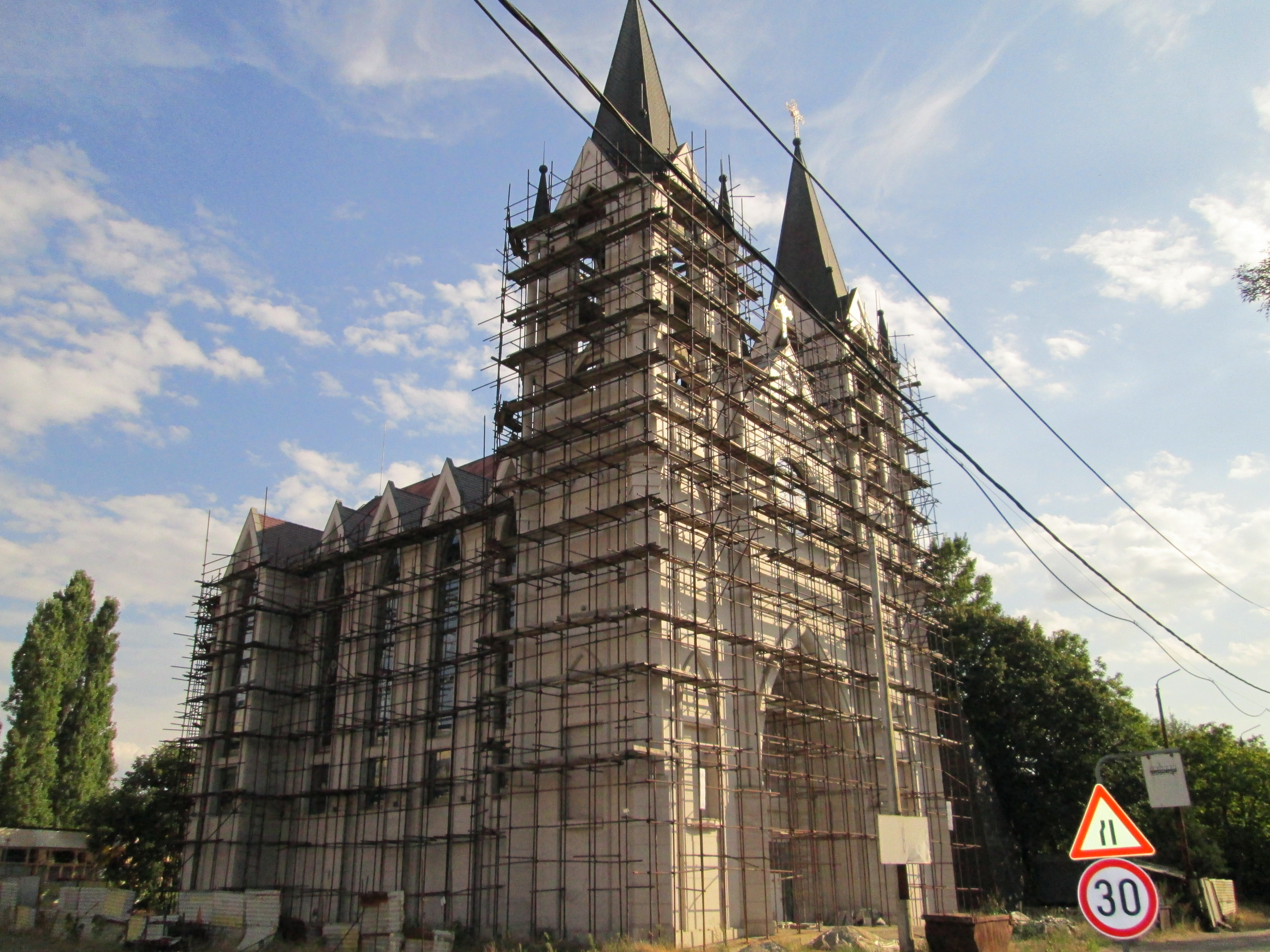
Vidin Catholic Cathedral Christ The Savior

"Christ the Savior" is a Catholic church in the port city of Vidin, Bulgaria on the Danube river. It is part of the Nikopol Diocese of the Roman Catholic Church and is a parish church.

== History ==
Catholic roots in Vidin date to the 14th century, when the Kingdom of Hungary took control of Vidin for a short time. In the following years an attempt was made to impose Catholicism on a mass scale in the region. A diocese and a Franciscan monastery were established on the territory of the Tsardom (empire) of Vidin. The parish in Vidin was founded in 1895.

Father Stanislav Petrov was the first priest. In 1896, Passionist Petar Jurovic opened a Catholic private German-French school in Vidin. The number of parishioners is in decline. In 1922, 200 Catholics lived in Vidin. After 20 years 50 remained. At that time, the parish priest was the Hungarian Father Hruza. and a small Catholic church operated in the city. After September 9, 1944, foreign clergy were expelled from Bulgaria and due to the lack of a priest (?), the parish ceased to exist.

In 2011, 271 people from Vidin self-identified as Catholics.

On May 7, 2016, in the city, the bishop of the Nikopol Diocese, Petko Hristov, proclaimed the resumption of the parish. The service was presided over by Bishop Hristov, together with the parish priest of Vidin, Father Plamen Gechev, and Fathers Yaroslav Bartkievich, Venci Nikolov and Paolo Cortesi. At the same time, several families from Italy settled there.

The construction of the church building began in 2007 as a private initiative using the funds of Borislav Lorinkov. The church building has an area of 1100 square meters and is located in the industrial part of the city. Meanwhile, a chapel in the city, dedicated to Saint Emet - a martyr from Vidin from the 3rd century, is used for services.

The church's dedicated holiday is May 7.

== Parish priests ==
- Father Stanislav Petrov (1895-)
- Father Plamen Genov (2011–2022)
- Father Wojciech Chmielewski (2022-)
