= French Church of St. Sauveur =

Episcopal Church in Pennsylvania

Coordinates: 39.948°N 75.178°W

The French Church of St. Sauveur (Église Episcopale Française du Saint-Sauveur) was organized on September 3, 1871 and chartered in February, 1872 to provide French-language services to Christians in the Episcopal Diocese of Pennsylvania. It served Francophones of French, Swiss, Belgian, German, Haitian, and American nationalities between 1872 and 1954. In the representative year of 1922, it had 361 members and 111 active communicants. Some members of the congregation were French-speaking Waldensians; its classes and social services were open to all, including Francophone Roman Catholics in Philadelphia. St. Sauveur was founded by the Rev. Charles François Bonaventure Miel (1818-1902), a former Jesuit from Dijon who had previously founded a French-speaking Episcopal church in Chicago, Illinois.

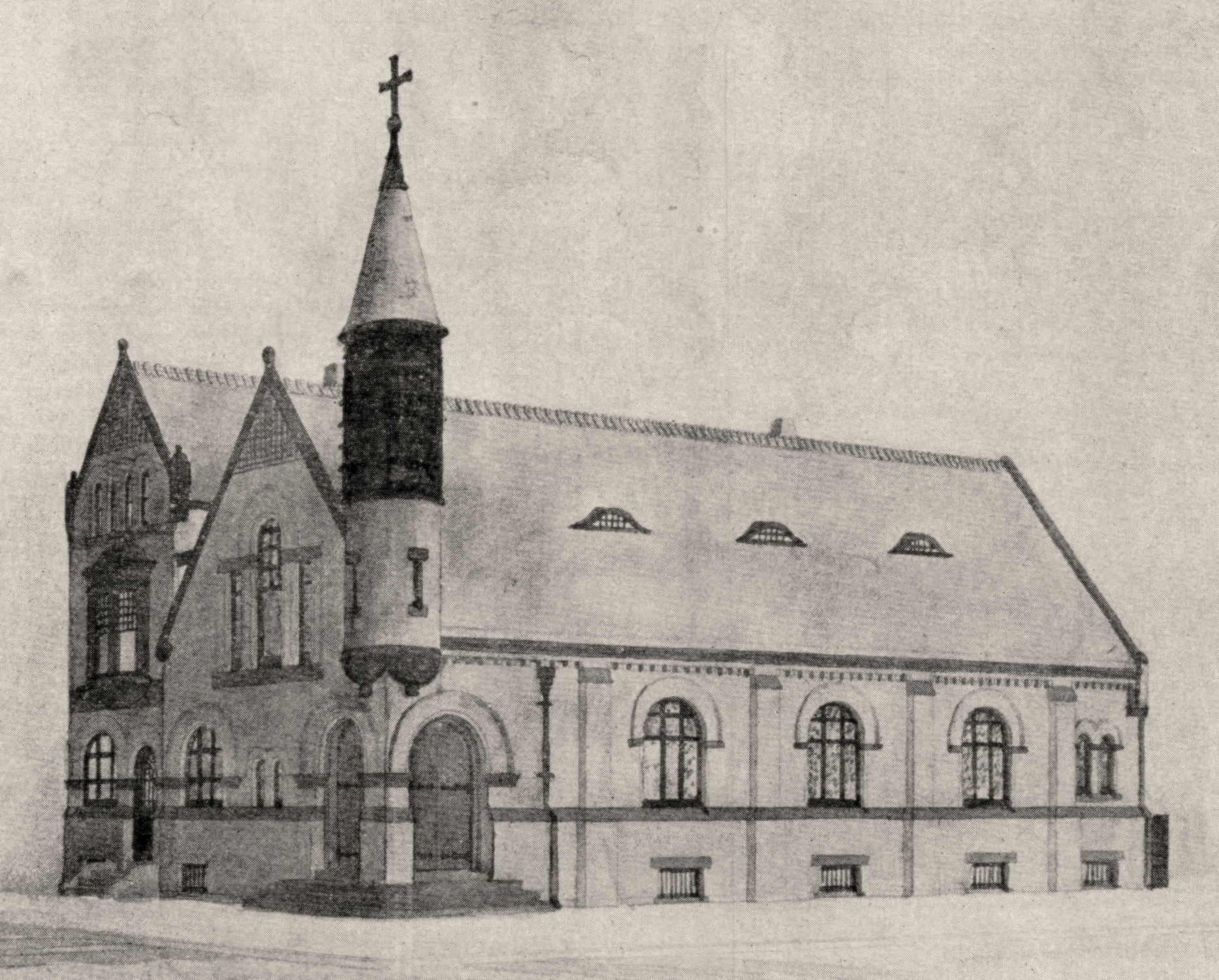
French Church of St. Sauveur, Philadelphia

The church's building at the corner of DeLancey and 22nd Street was opened for services on April 1, 1888 (Easter Sunday). It was described as "a beautiful little chapel of brick, in Gothic style, steeple and belfry, stained glass windows, open roof in the interior, with oak casing and walnut beams, a gallery all across the lower portion of the church and a beautiful recess [sic] chancel, with a broad platform in front."

St. Sauveur used its own translation of the Book of Common Prayer into French, prepared by C. F. B. Miel and published in three editions by 1890. The congregation had several internal societies, including a Société des Dames Patronesses de Saint Sauveur for Americans interested in its activities, a chapter of the Brotherhood of St. Andrew for lay men, and a Guild de St. Sauveur.

In 1926, the diocese sold St. Sauveur's building and adjoining parish house for $44,000 and accepted an invitation to become a congregation of Holy Trinity Memorial Episcopal Church at 2212 Spruce Street. Its furnishings were incorporated into the Chapel of the Ascension, Rhawnhurst, and the church and parish house were partially converted into an apartment building and store. The church's 300 lb (140 kg) bell was stolen and recovered at a scrap yard in June, 1927.

Bishop Thomas J. Garland initially earmarked the funds from the sale of the building for the construction of a new church building for Francophone use, but this plan was never carried out. The congregation's final service was on Sunday, May 31, 1953.

== Clergy ==
- Charles François Bonaventure Miel (French, 1872-1902)
- Charles Mason (American assistant)
- Florian Vurpillot (French, 1896-1913)
- Théophilus Daniel Malan (Swiss, 1914-1925)
- Paul J. Beguin
- Elliot White (American)
- Archdeacon James Fry Bullitt (American)
- Victor Rahard
- Marcel Jean Brun (French, 1934-1953)

== See also ==
- French Church du Saint-Esprit, French Episcopal Church in New York City
- French language in the United States

== Bibliography ==
- Manuel de prières et de cantiques à l'usage de l'église épiscopale française du Saint Sauveur, Philadelphie (third edition, 1890)
- L'Avenir monthly journal in English and French, 1880—
