= St Saviour's Church, Scarborough =

Church in Scarborough, North Yorkshire, England

Coordinates: 54°16′50″N 0°24′41″W

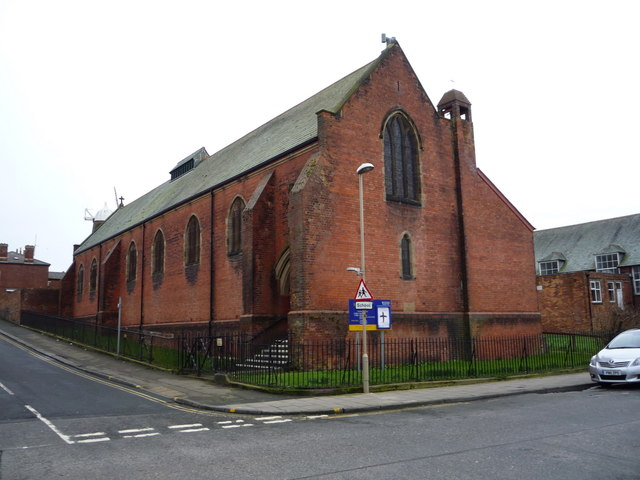
The church, in 2016

St Saviour's Church is an Anglican church in Scarborough, North Yorkshire, a town in England.

The church lies on Gladstone Road in the west end of the town. It was built between 1901 and 1902, to a neo-Gothic design by John Thomas Micklethwaite. In 2025, plans were submitted to convert the neighbouring church hall into 11 flats.

The building is constructed of red brick, and consists of a combined nave and chancel. Inside, there is a south aisle, separated by an arcade of octagonal piers built of stone.
