= St. Saviour's Anglican Church (Orono, Ontario) =

Church building in Orono, Ontario, Canada

Coordinates: 43.97917°N 78.61732°W

General information
- Architectural style: Gothic Revival
- Location: Mill Street; Orono, Ontario, Canada
- Completed: 1869

Technical details
- Structural system: one-storey redbrick

St. Saviour's Anglican Church Orono is an historic redbrick church building located on Mill Street in Orono, Ontario, Canada. It was built in 1869 by the Orono congregation of the Bible Christian Church in the Gothic Revival style of architecture.

In 1884 the Bible Christian Church merged with the Methodist Church of Canada and the building became redundant and was bought by the Anglican parish which became St. Saviour's.

St. Saviour's Anglican Church is still an active parish in the Trent Durham Episcopal Area of the Anglican Diocese of Toronto. Its current incumbent is the Rev. Augusto Núñez.
