= St Saviour's Cathedral =

St Saviour's Cathedral or variations may refer to:

== Australia ==
- St Saviour's Cathedral, Goulburn, New South Wales

== France ==
- Aix Cathedral (Cathédrale Saint-Sauveur d'Aix-en-Provence)
- Cayenne Cathedral (Cathédrale Saint-Sauveur de Cayenne)
- Vabres Cathedral (Cathédrale Saint-Sauveur-et-Saint-Pierre de Vabres), a former cathedral

== South Africa ==
- St Saviour's Cathedral, Pietermaritzburg

== United Kingdom ==
- Southwark Cathedral, the Cathedral and Collegiate Church of St Saviour and St Mary Overie, Southwark, London

== See also ==
- St. Salvator's Cathedral, Bruges, Belgium
- St Saviour (disambiguation)
- St Sauveur (disambiguation)
- San Salvador (disambiguation)
- St Saviour's Church (disambiguation)
