= Church of Our Saviour, Friend of Children =

Historic church in Michigan, United States

- U.S. National Register of Historic Places
- Michigan State Historic Site
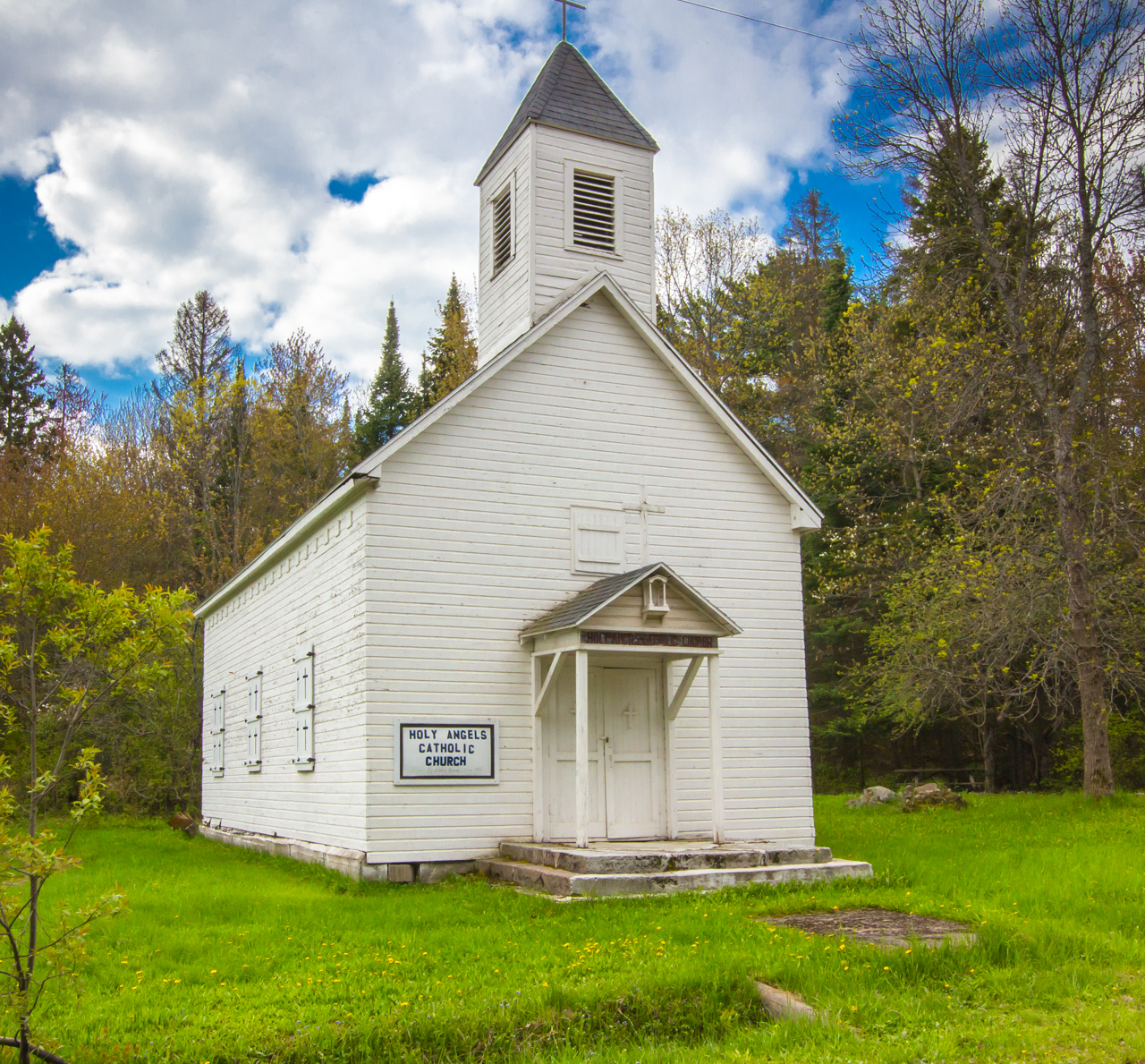

- Location within Michigan
- Interactive map
- Location: North Shore Rd., Payment Settlement on Sugar Island, near Sault Ste. Marie, Michigan
- Coordinates: 46°31′38.66″N 84°9′4.51″W
- Built: 1856-57
- Built by: Michael G. Payment
- NRHP reference No.: 82002831

Significant dates
- Added to NRHP: July 08, 1982
- Designated MSHS: January 19, 1978

Church of Our Saviour, Friend of Children, also known as Holy Angels Roman Catholic Church, is a church located on North Shore Road on Sugar Island, near Sault Ste. Marie, Michigan. It was designated a Michigan State Historic Site in 1978 and listed on the National Register of Historic Places in 1982.

== History ==
Michael G. Payment was born in Montreal in 1814. In 1827 he moved to Detroit and became involved in business. He soon was put in charge of cargo shipments, in which capacity he traded goods with Native Americans. In 1845, Payment moved to Sugar Island and established a small settlement, known at the time as "Payment's Landing" or "Payment Settlement." Payment undertook trade with the local Ojibwe people, establishing a successful trading post. Beginning in 1853, Bishop Frederic Baraga was a frequent visitor to the settlement, and in 1856 Baraga purchased lumber and requested that Michael Payment construct a church at the site. Payment complied, and the building was completed in 1857.

Michael Payment returned to Detroit in 1874, but regular services were held at the church until it closed in 1953. The church reopened in 1982 for services in the summer. It is the last remaining structure from Payment's Landing.

== Description ==
Church of Our Saviour, Friend of Children is a single story frame structure sitting on a fieldstone foundation. The exterior was originally clad in clapboard, but at some time weatherboarding was installed over the original siding. The church has a gable roof with a square, pyramidal-roofed belfry at the top. Each side has three windows, and one end has an entry portico below a plain wooden cross.
