= Cathedral of Jesus Saviour of the World, Rrëshen =

Cathedral of Jesus Saviour of the World
- Katedralja e Jezusi i Vetmi Shpëtimtar i Botës
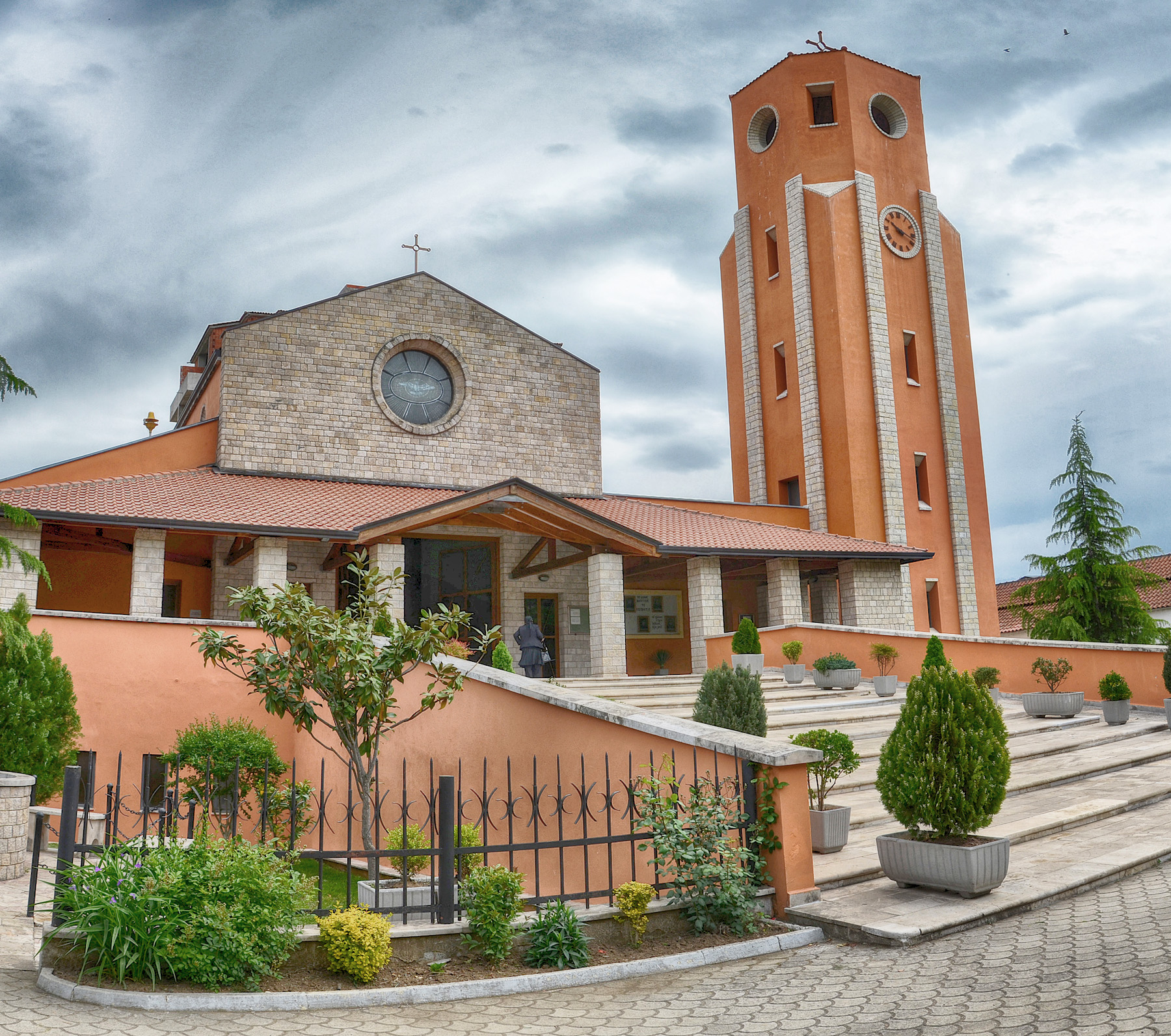
- Cathedral of Jesus Saviour of the World
- 41°46′6″N 19°52′38″E
- Location: Rrëshen
- Country: Albania
- Denomination: Roman Catholic Church

The Cathedral of Jesus Saviour of the World (Albanian: Katedralja e Jezusi i Vetmi Shpëtimtar i Botës, also Catholic Cathedral of Rrëshen) is a religious building affiliated with the Catholic Church that functions as the cathedral of Rrëshen. It is in Rrëshen, in the municipality of Mirditë, Albania.

The cathedral was built in 2002 by order of the bishop of the diocese, Cristoforo Palmieri, and was dedicated on November 9, 2002. It is the main Catholic building in the District of Mirditë after the Abbey of St. Alexander of Orosh.

== See also ==
· · ·
- Roman Catholicism in Albania
- Jesus Christ
- Catholic Church
