= Cathedral of Christ the Saviour, Banja Luka =

Serbian Orthodox cathedral in Banja Luka, Bosnia and Herzegovina

Cathedral of Christ the Saviour
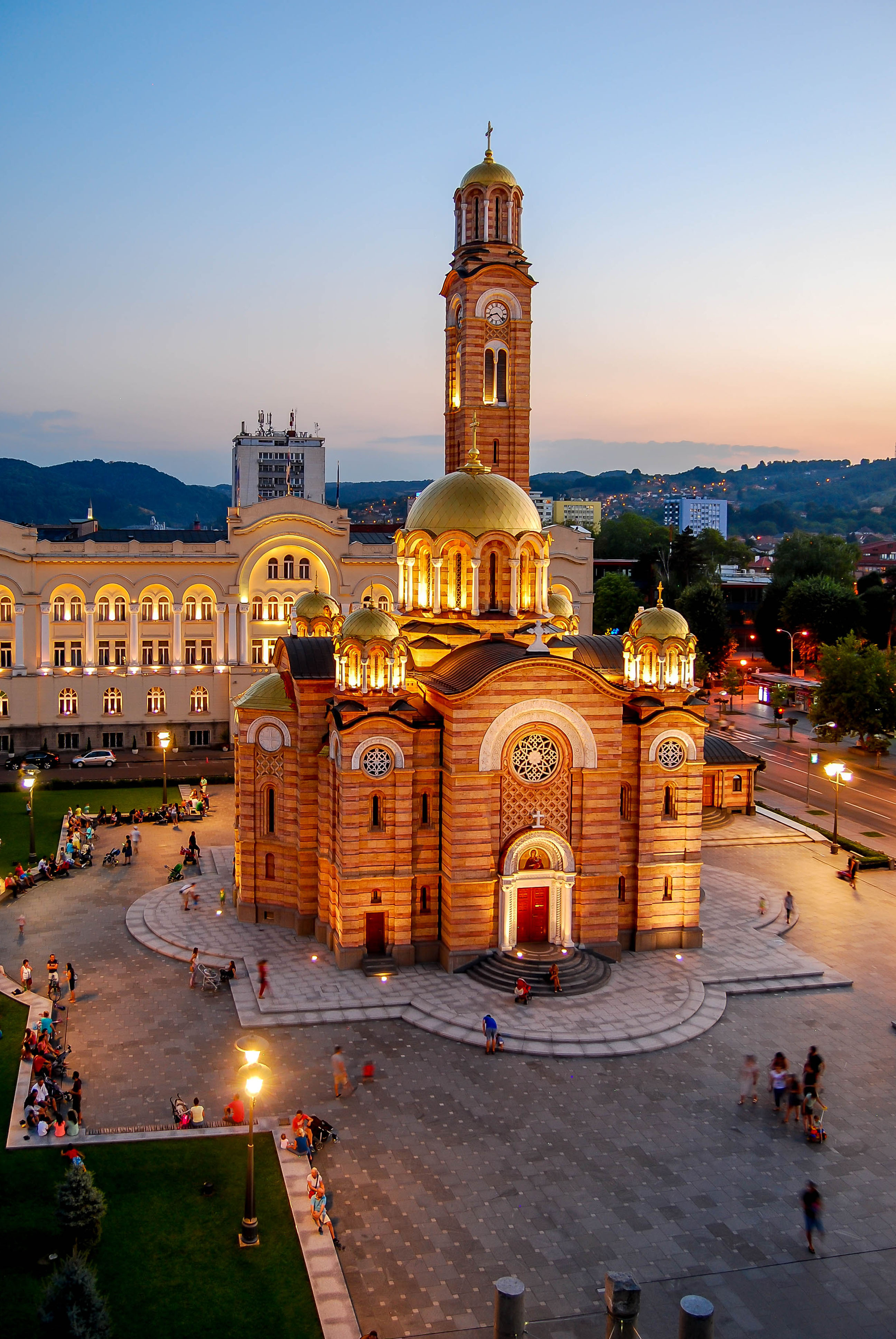
- Cathedral of Christ the Saviour, pictured in 2013
- Cathedral of Christ the Saviour
- 44.772272°N 17.191787°E
- Location: Banja Luka, Republika Srpska
- Country: Bosnia and Herzegovina
- Denomination: Serbian Orthodox Church

History
- Dedication: Christ the Saviour

Architecture
- Completed: 1929 (built); 2004 (rebuilt)

Administration
- Archdiocese: Eparchy of Banja Luka

The Cathedral of Christ the Saviour (Serbian: Саборни храм Христа Спаситеља, romanized: Saborni hram Hrista Spasitelja) is an Eastern Orthodox church located in Banja Luka, Bosnia and Herzegovina. It is under jurisdiction of the Eparchy of Banja Luka of the Serbian Orthodox Church and serves as its cathedral church.

== History ==
The Church of the Holy Trinity was built during interwar period in the downtown of Banja Luka. The construction of the church took from 1925 to 1929, and was solemnly consecrated on the Day of Salvation in 1939. During the German bombing on April 12, 1941, the church was hit and the altar section (apse) was significantly damaged. In May of the same year, the Ustashas declared the church a "mound of the city" and ordered the Serbs, Jews and Roma to completely demolish it, brick by brick.

During the time of the communist Yugoslavia, the monument to fallen soldiers was erected in its place. The aforementioned monument to fallen soldiers was moved to a nearby location in 1993, at the time when the wartime leadership of Banja Luka renamed majority of streets, schools, and institutions. The erection of the new church began in 1993 when the foundations were consecrated. This solemn act was performed by Serbian Patriarch Pavle with the bishops and clergy of the Serbian Orthodox Church. The church was rebuilt under the name of the Cathedral of Christ the Saviour, because, in the meantime, another church consecrated in the name of the Holy Trinity has been built in Banja Luka, as a memorial to the demolished one.

On the occasion of the 20th anniversary of the founding and celebration of the Day of Republika Srpska, Serbian Patriarch Irinej held the liturgy at the cathedral.

== Architecture ==
The cathedral is built of red and yellow travertine stone, originating from Mesopotamia, whose quality (excavation and processing) is certified by Prof. Dr. Bilbija, an expert from the Belgrade Institute for Material Testing. It is built with a three-layer wall: stone, reinforced concrete, brick. The domes are covered with golden stainless steel, brought from Siberia. Exterior construction work on the temple was completed on September 26, 2004, when the first liturgy was also celebrated.

The present church is architecturally identical to the previous one and is the tallest religious building in Banja Luka, with a bell tower 47 meters high and a 22.5 meter dome. The Bishop's Temple was consecrated by Bishop Ephrem on Salvation Day in 2009.

== Gallery ==
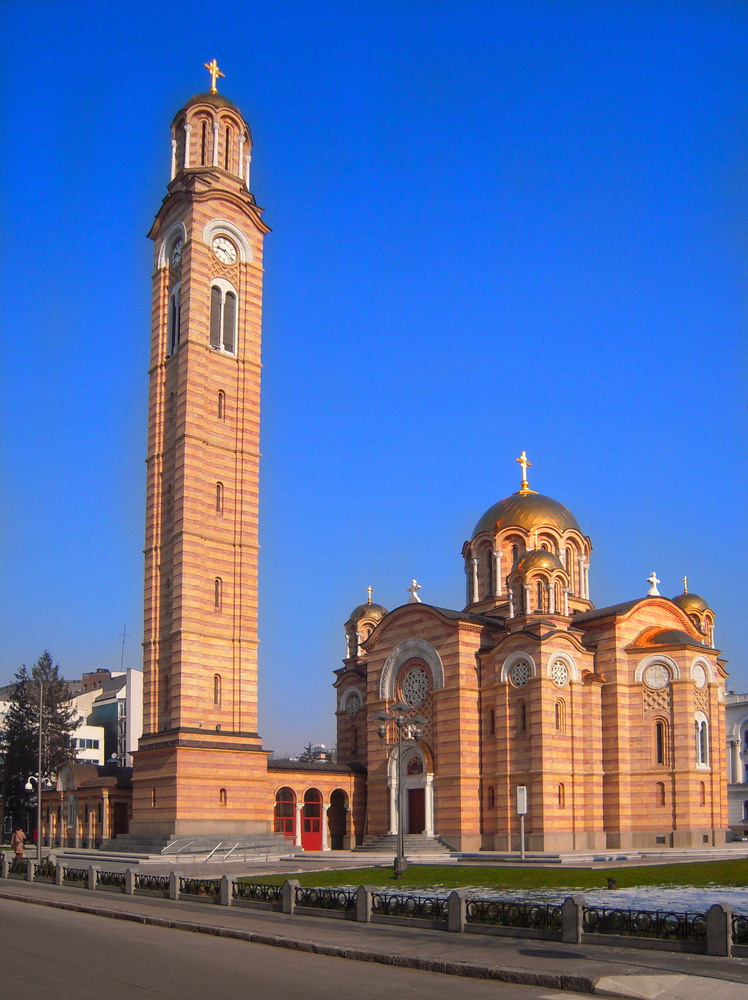

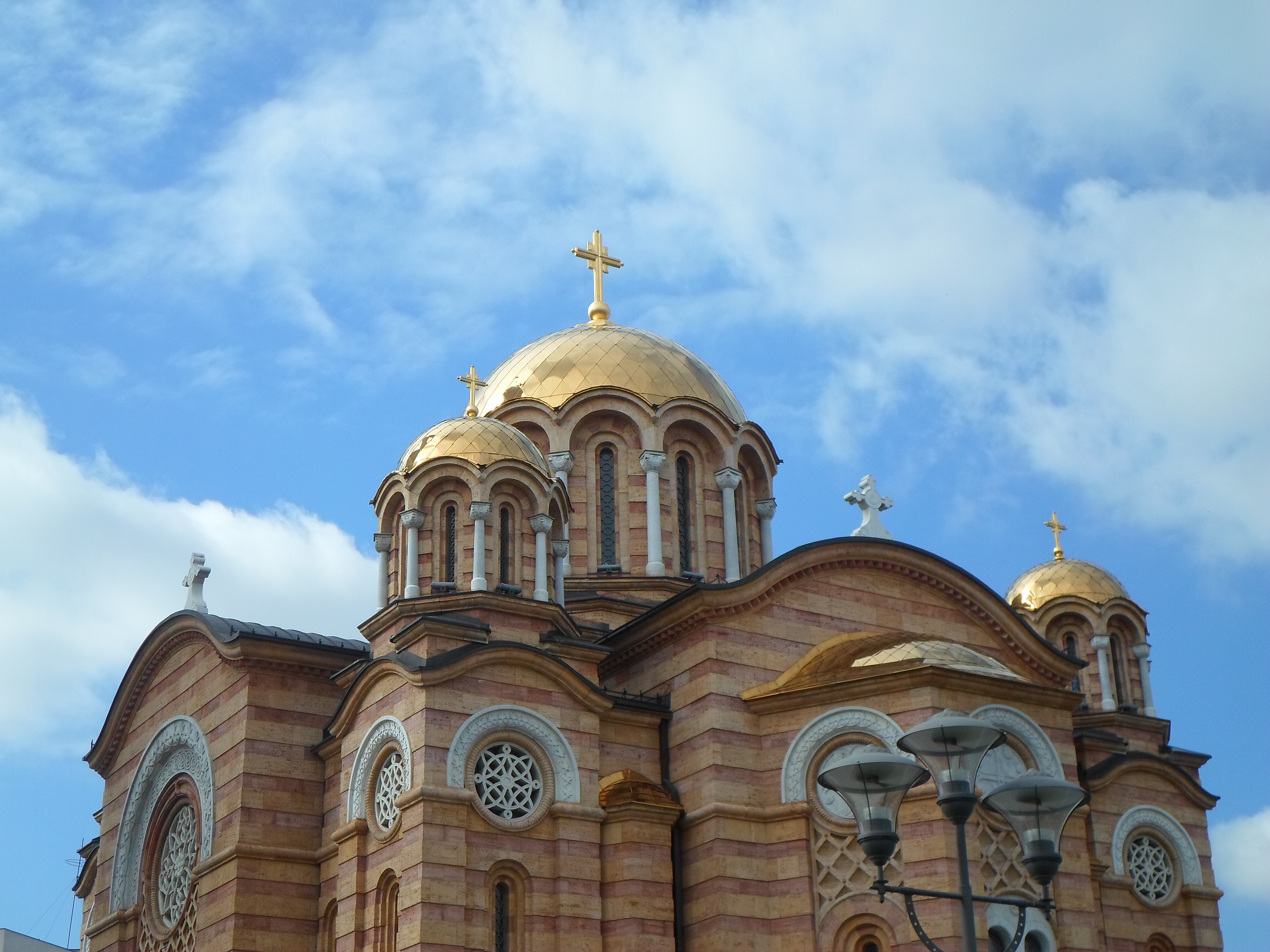

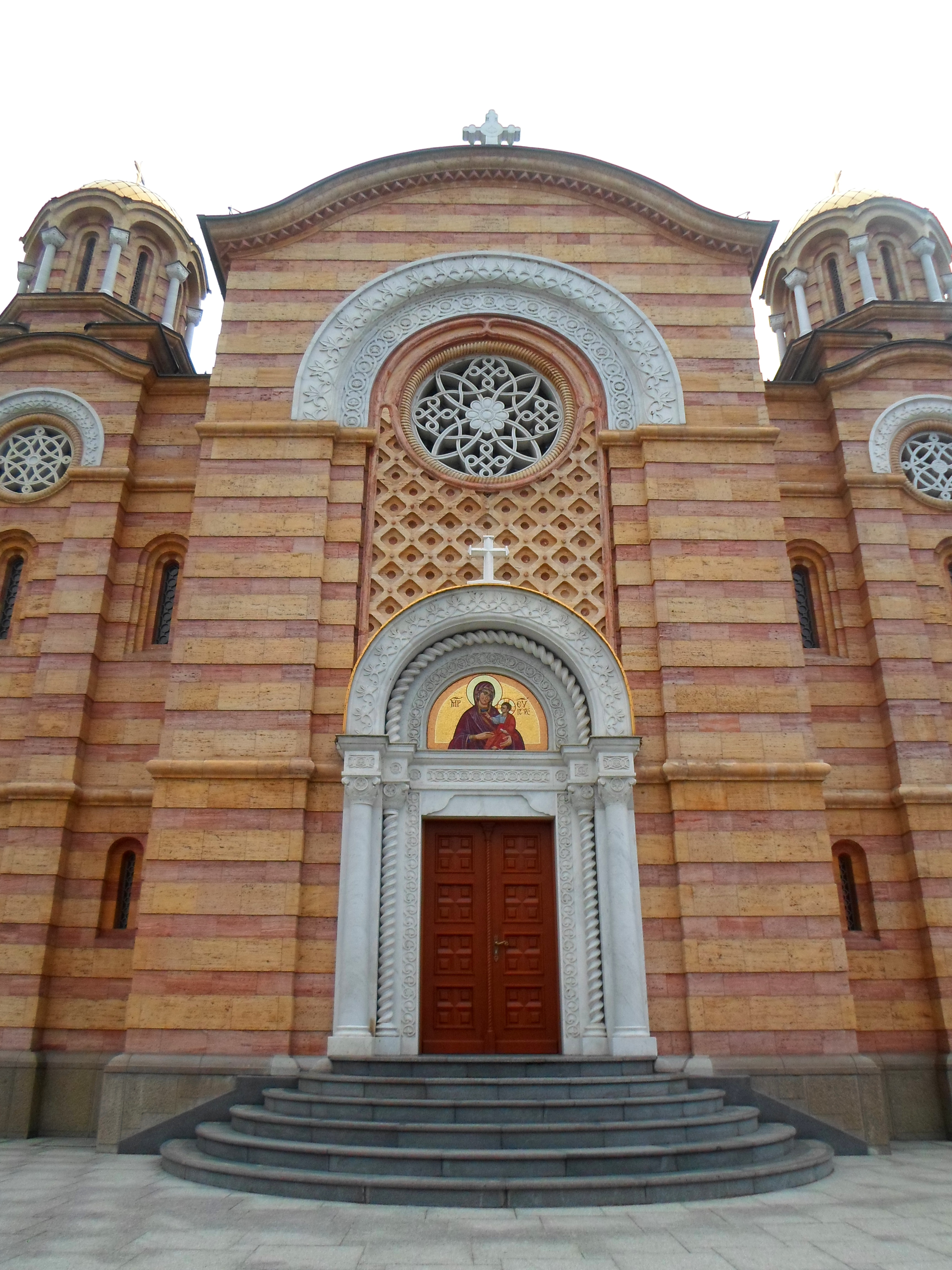

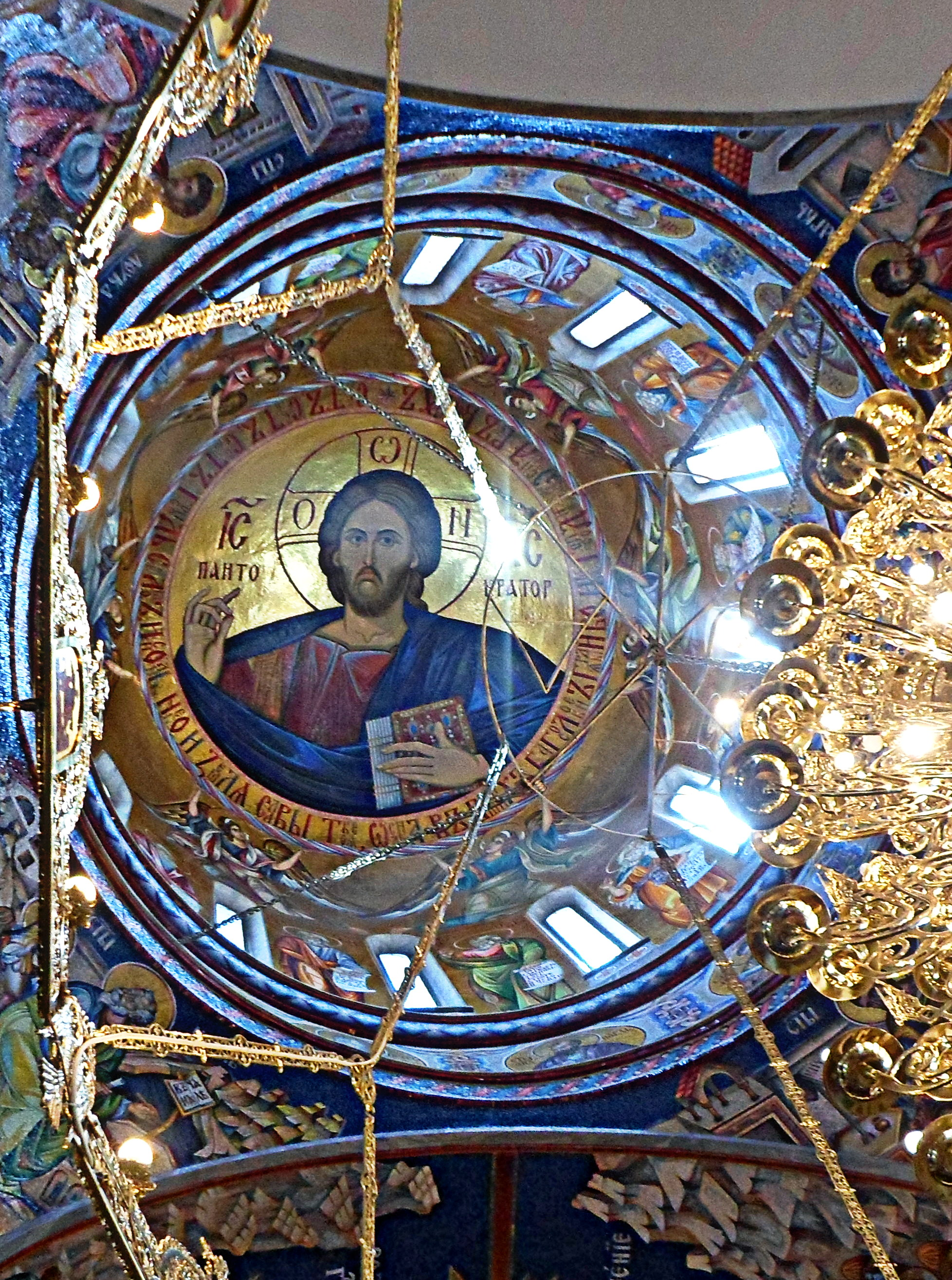

== See also ==
- Church of the Holy Trinity, Banja Luka
