= Cathedral of Christ the Saviour (Kaliningrad) =

Cathedral in Kaliningrad, Russia

Coordinates: 54°43′15″N 20°30′12″E

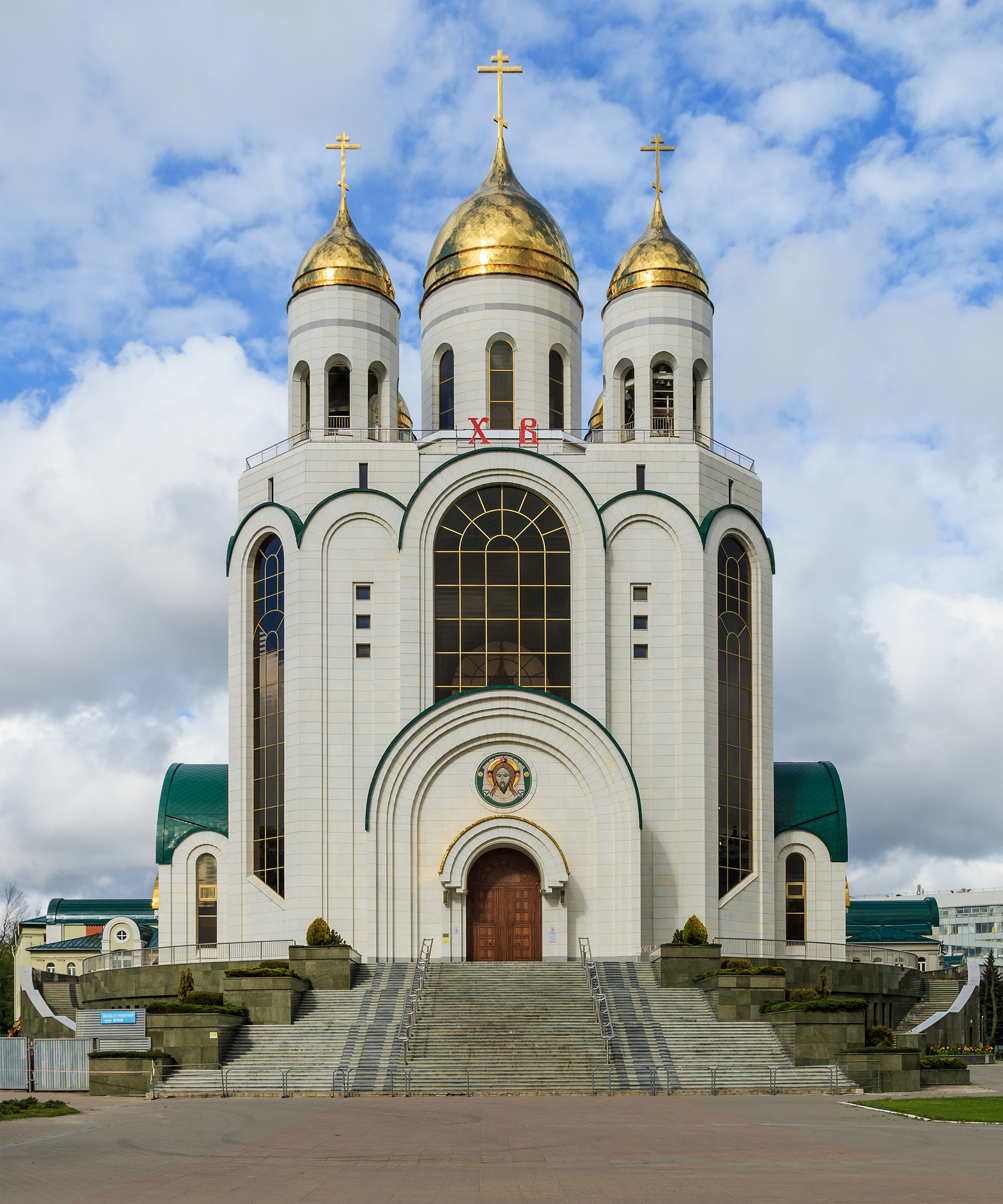
The Cathedral of Christ the Saviour in Kaliningrad is the largest church of Kaliningrad Oblast. The Russian Orthodox cathedral is 70 meters high, and it is the dominant building of the inner city on Ploshchad Pobedy .

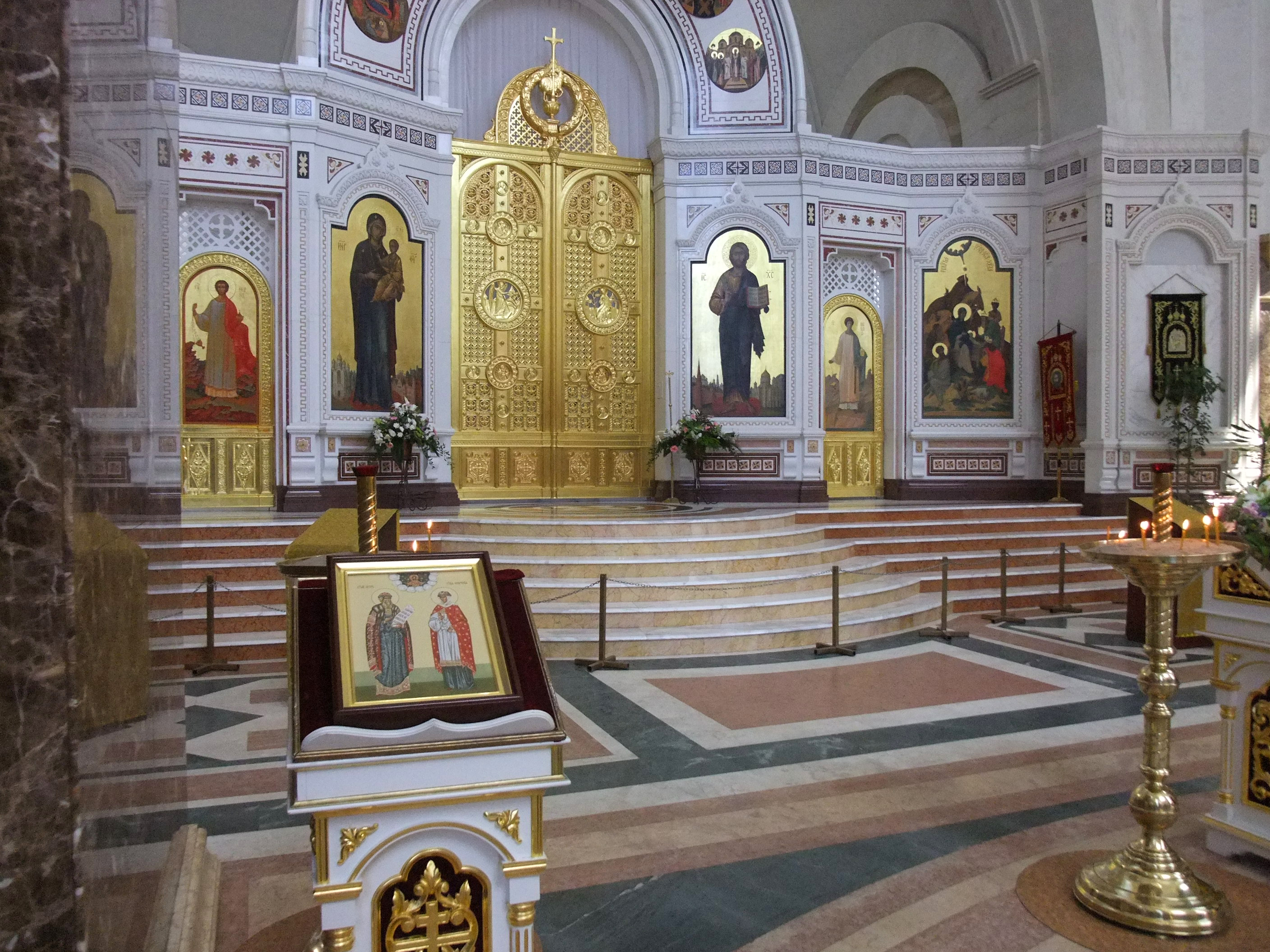
The Cathedral of Christ the Saviour in Kaliningrad. The church's architect is Oleg Kopylov, and was completed in September 2006.

The Cathedral of Christ the Saviour (Russian: Храм Христа Спасителя, Khram Khrista Spasitelya) in the Russian city of Kaliningrad (formerly Königsberg) is the largest church of Kaliningrad Oblast. It is the dominant building of the inner city and is situated near the central square, called Ploshchad Pobedy (Victory Square).

The cathedral's construction was completed on 10 September 2006. A small wooden chapel that served as a temporary worship space still stands nearby.

== Architecture ==
The Russian Orthodox Cathedral of Christ the Saviour was designed by architect Oleg Kopylov. Standing at 70 meters high, the temple was built in the style of church architecture in the duchy of Vladimir-Suzdal.

== History ==
The cornerstone for the structure was laid in 1995. In 1996, Russian president Boris Yeltsin and Metropolitan Kirill brought a capsule with earth taken from Moscow's Christ the Saviour Cathedral. The upper church of the Resurrection was consecrated on September 10, 2006, by Patriarch Alexy II, and timed to coincide with the 20th anniversary of the opening of the first Orthodox church in Kaliningrad.

The lower church in the name of the Holy Face of Our Saviour was consecrated on September 27, 2007, by Metropolitan of Smolensk and Kaliningrad Kirill (Gundyaev). The "Memel" iconostasis created during the Seven Years' War for the Russian garrison in Memel (Klaipėda) was subsequently installed here. The lower temple is a temple of military glory and is dedicated to the memory of the Russian soldiers who died in the Seven Years' War, the Napoleonic Wars, World War I and World War II in East Prussia and today's Kaliningrad Oblast .

In July 2010 near the cathedral a new small church was opened, established in the same style and dedicated to Saints Peter and Fevronia of Murom.
