= Church of Christ the Saviour, Pristina =

Unfinished Serbian Orthodox Christian church in Kosovo

Church of Christ the Saviour
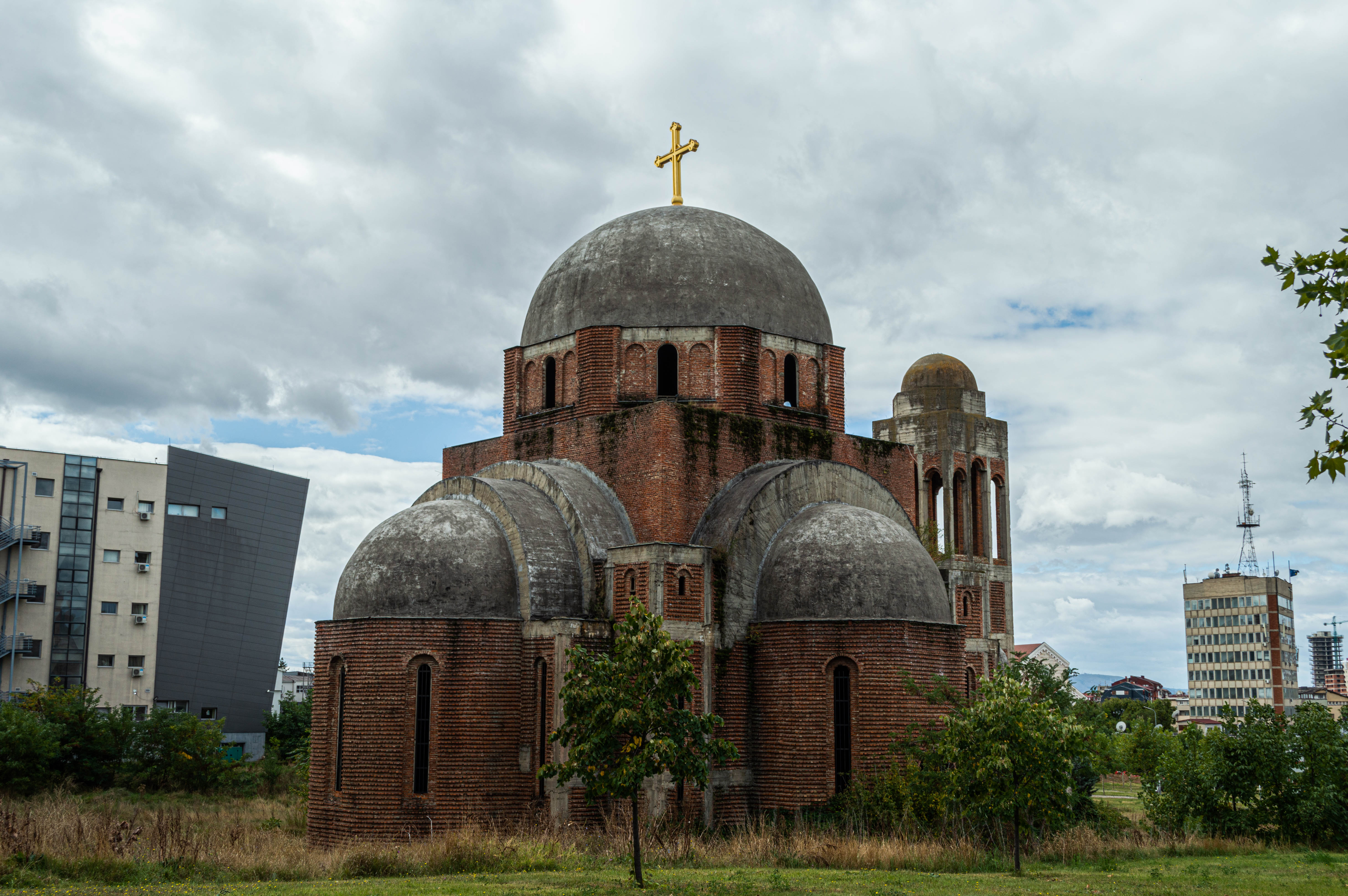
- The building in 2020
- Interactive map of the Church of Christ the Saviour area

General information
- Location: Agim Ramadani, Vreshtat, Pristina, Kosovo
- Coordinates: 42.6585°N 21.1636°E
- Groundbreaking: 1995
- Owner: Serbian Orthodox Church

The Cathedral church of Christ the Saviour (Serbian: Саборни храм Христа Спаса у Приштини/Saborni hram Hrista Spasa u Prištini; Albanian: Katedralja e Krishtit shpëtimtar) in Pristina, Kosovo, is an unfinished Serbian Orthodox Christian church whose construction began in 1992. Due to have been completed in 1999, its construction, on the campus of the pre-war University of Pristina, was interrupted by the Kosovo War.

== History ==
The church is located on the site of the campus of the University of Pristina. The site was first planned by Albanian architect Bashkim Fehmiu in 1973 as part of an open plan campus and was seen by the local Albanian population at that time as "a symbol of knowledge dissemination" stripped from any religious symbolism. In 1989, the autonomous status of Kosovo within the Yugoslav federation was removed by President Slobodan Milošević of the Serbian Republic and direct control was established from Belgrade. Pristina Municipality, under control from Belgrade took a small parcel of land belonging to Pristina University and gave it to the Serbian Orthodox Church (SOC). A new plan for the site designed by Ljubiša Folić was announced at that time. A church was to be constructed in a central location of the campus on the grounds of the disputed plot between the University of Pristina and the Serbian Orthodox Church. A 1991 proposition by Serbian architect Spasoje Krunić was the final church design which was selected. At completion, the church would have 1389 (a reference to the Battle of Kosovo) golden crosses according to Krunić's design.

The construction of the church began in 1992 and its symbolism was part of the policies of Serbian nationalism in Serbia. Its foundations were laid in the campus of the University of Pristina at a time when Albanian students and professors were expelled from the university buildings and there was an extensive campaign of serbization going on in Kosovo. Work on the building halted due to dwindling funds and recommenced in March 1995. The external structure was completed by 1998 yet the deteriorating security environment in Kosovo led to the suspension of construction. Construction of the building was not welcomed by the predominantly Muslim population of Kosovo.

Following the war and international military intervention in 1999, Kosovo became a protectorate under a United Nations administration (UNMIK) and a failed attempt was made to destroy the building with explosives that did little damage to the structure. Seen by Kosovo Albanians as a symbol of Milošević's rule, the building was vandalised in the aftermath of the war. The UNMIK administration held concerns that the Orthodox church could become a target due to retaliatory violence and the building was placed under protection along with other Orthodox churches of Kosovo. In 2003 the building became part of discussions by the public over its future.

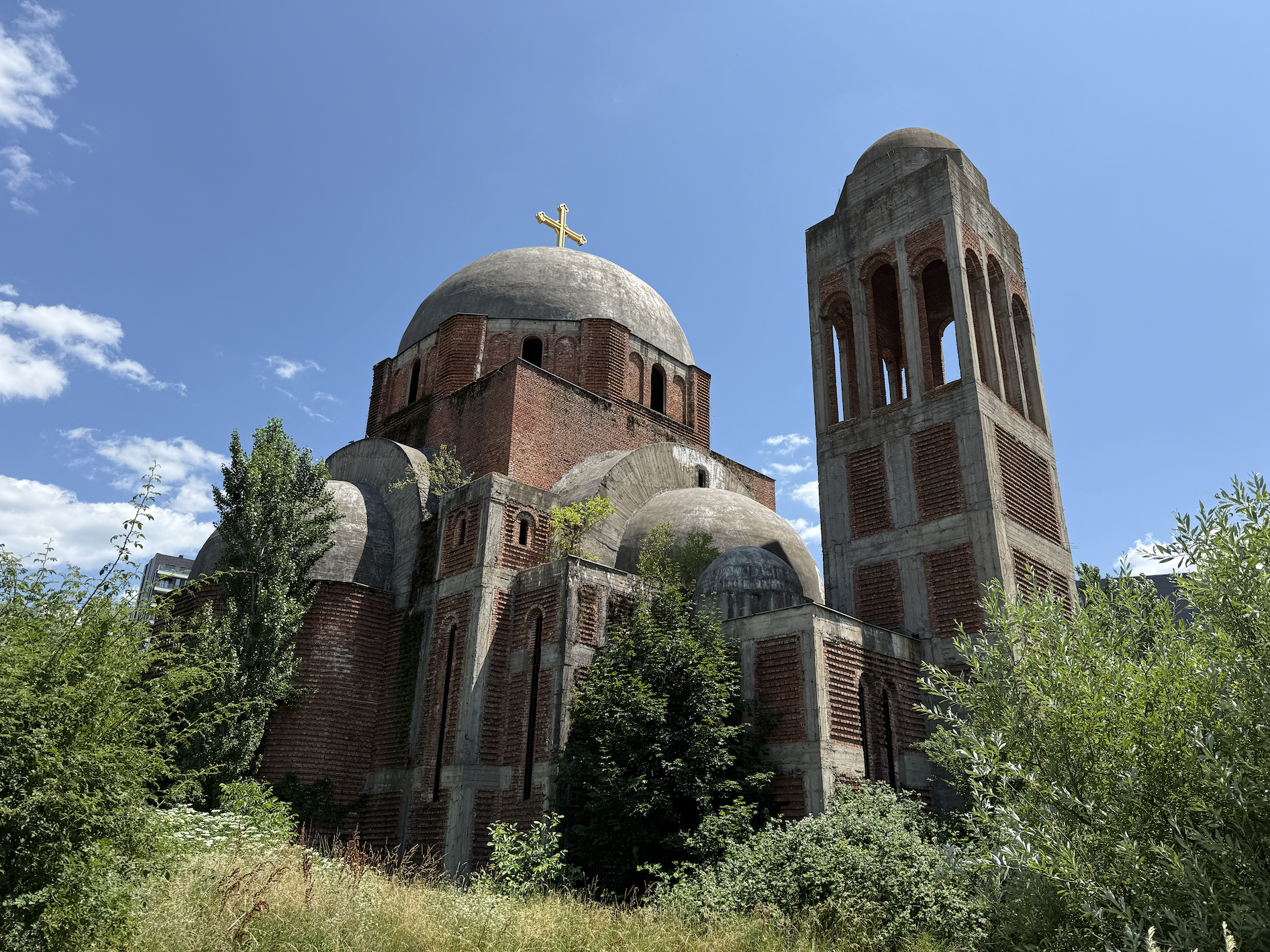
The church in June 2025

Pristina Municipality, with an Albanian majority population became part of the newly established UNMIK provisional government institutions of Kosovo and it proposed four uses for the building: preserved as is, demolition, turned into a museum and usage for some alternative purpose. Albanian controlled Pristina municipality was openly hostile to the structure. Based in Gracanica at the time, the SOC stated that it was against the proposals viewing them as an attack toward a religious location and an attempt to remove the Serb presence from Pristina. The SOC compiled property documents demonstrating ownership over multiple locations within Pristina such as the Kosovo parliament, the accommodation buildings of Pristina university and its library. To counter municipal plans, the SOC suggestion was that these buildings be turned into museums. The UNMIK eventually overruled Pristina Municipality over its proposals.

During the riots of 2004 by Kosovo Albanians against Serbs that resulted in the destruction or damage of 35 religious monuments, nearly all Orthodox churches, the building in Pristina was not damaged. Between 2005-2007 the international community sought a political solution for Kosovo's status and it generated the Ahtisaari Plan which outlined supervised independence and a provision to protect SOC property. In relation to the cathedral building, the matter became interpreted through property rights over land ownership and identification of the owner. The Ahtisaari Plan also made the Kosovo government through its Culture Ministry in charge of protecting the property of the SOC, an arrangement which the Serbian church did not acknowledge. To breach the impasse, the EU special representative (EUSR) in Kosovo selected a neutral mediator, ambassador Moschopoulos of the Greek Liaison Office to discuss matters between the government and church. After the communication mechanism was created, efforts were devoted toward resolving ownership of the site.

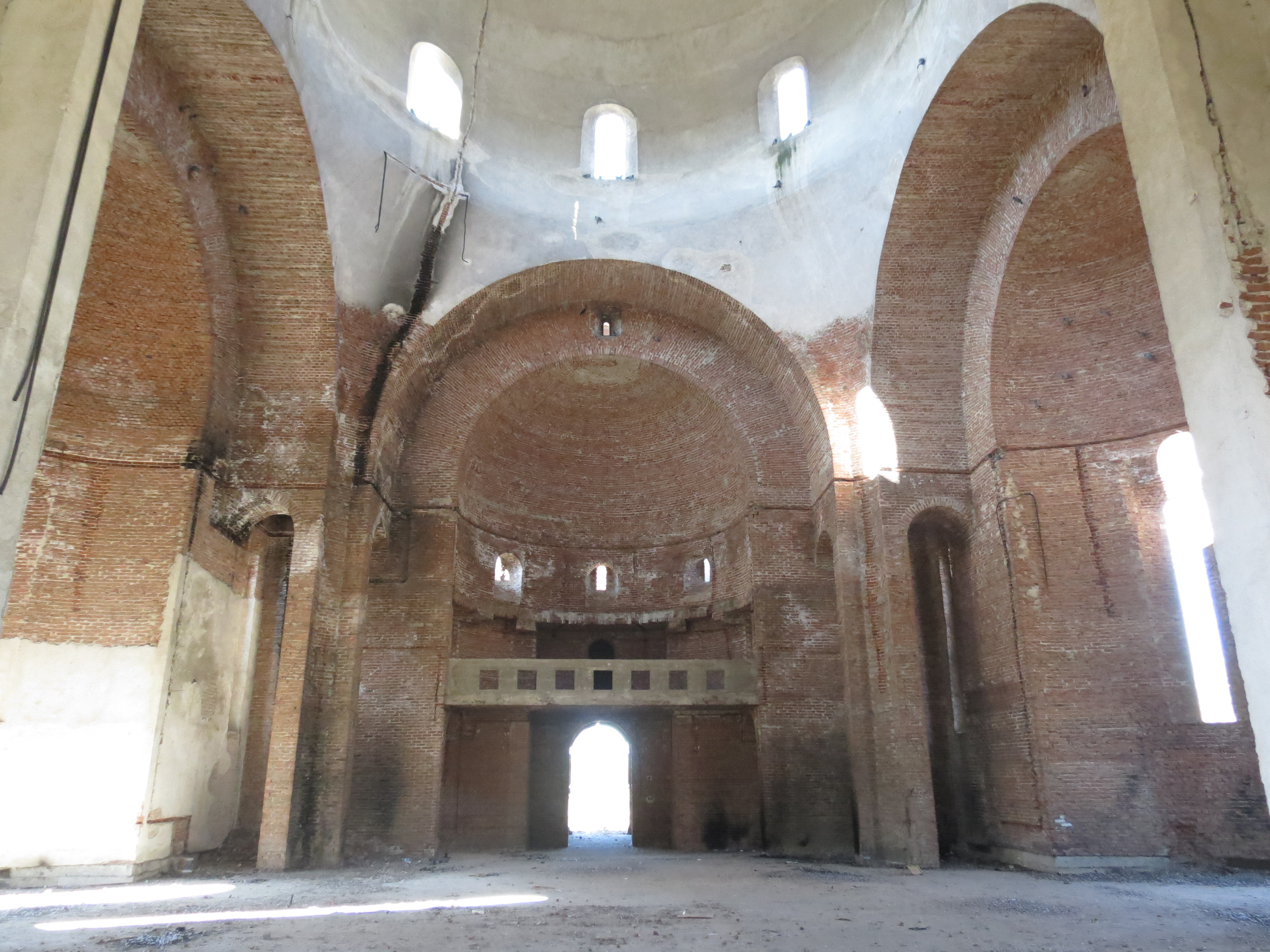
The unfinished interior in October 2012

In the aftermath of Kosovan independence (2008), communication was nonexistent between the government and SOC. During 2009 the Kosovo Culture Ministry contacted the International Civilian Office (ICO) that through the EUSR contacted the SOC and international neutral organisations mediated between both sides to reach a resolution. The SOC produced title deeds showing the transfer of the site during the mid 1990s and they were allowed permission to undertake any future construction on the site. By 2011 public debate and administrative constraints over the structure had ceased and the SOC devoted its efforts to raising money for restoration and future constriction of the building. In 2015 construction still had not resumed on the site and other administrative and legal issues had arisen, while the building was vandalised.

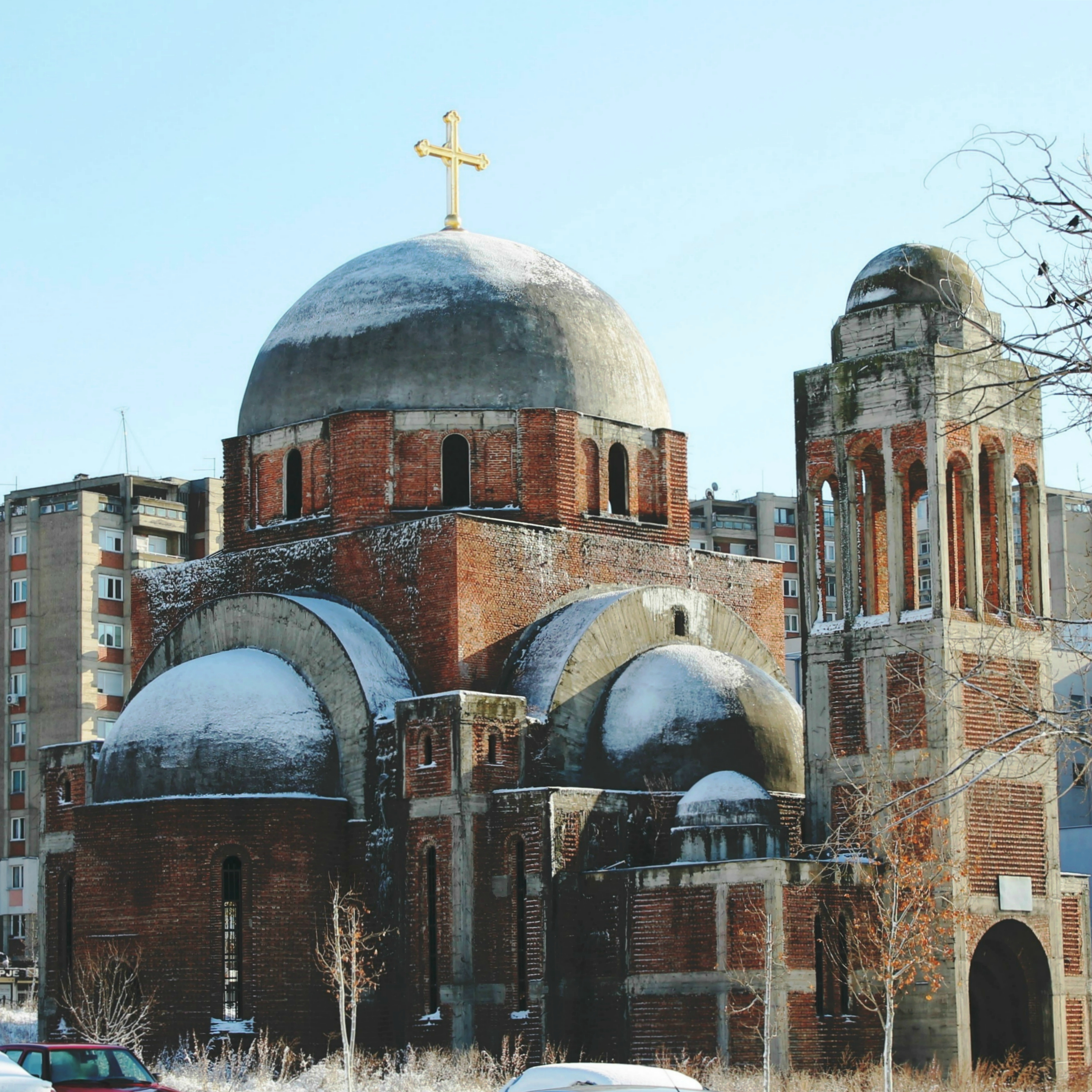
The church in the winter

The future of the building remains uncertain. Ownership of the building and the land on which it is located is disputed between the current University of Pristina and the Serbian Orthodox Church. Various Kosovo Albanian intellectuals have called for its demolition. In response for calls for its demolition, the church has been heavily desecrated and vandalised. Throughout 2016 the church was set on fire and turned into a public toilet and dumpsite. In 2016 the University of Pristina failed in a four-year bid to take ownership of the land on which the church was built on through judicial proceedings. The Kosovo Appeals Court granted land ownership rights of the church grounds to the Serbian Orthodox Church, however the University of Pristina continues to block attempts to refurbish the church.

On 10 June 2021, the Eparchy of Raška and Prizren entered the grounds of the disputed property and conducted a religious ceremony under Bishop Teodosije Šibalić for the first time since 1998. The event was conducted without a police permit and was widely criticized within Kosovo as "political use of religion" and a "political stunt by the Serbian government" just before a new round of negotiations between the Kosovan and Serbian government. Hajrulla Çeku, Minister of Culture of Kosovo announced that the event was illegal as the property on which the church was built in the 1990s is still under legal dispute by the University of Pristina and the Serbian Orthodox Church. Dalibor Jevtić, a Serb politician, posted on Twitter a few photos of policemen standing outside the premises of the church and claimed that the police were sent to monitor the liturgy. The director of the Office for Kosovo and Metohija of Serbia called the "presence of police officers outside the church premises an obvious threat to believers which served as warning of what will happen to them if they come to this shrine in the city again, from which 40,000 Serbs were expelled from their homes after 1999". During the night of June 11, a graffiti stating "Jesus hates Serbs" appeared on the church entrance. It was quickly removed by student activists of Social Democratic Party of Kosovo the next morning who called it a "provocation aimed at igniting religious and ethnic tensions". On June 11, 2021 the union of the students of the University of Pristina held a protest in the university campus at the location where the church has been built and called it a "monument built by war criminals" (a reference to the presence of war criminal and mafia boss Željko Ražnatović at the ceremony of the beginning of its building in 1992). The students asked for the church to be removed from their campus or to be turned into a museum about the Yugoslav Wars and the war crimes of the Milošević regime.
