= Grykë Manati =

- Village
- Location within Albania
- Coordinates: 41°46′46″N 19°40′31″E
- Country: Albania
- County: Lezhë
- Municipality: Lezhë
- Administrative unit: Kolsh
- Time zone: UTC+1 (CET)
  - Summer (DST): UTC+2 (CEST)

Grykë Manati is a village in Lezhë County, northwestern Albania. When local government was reformed in 2015, the village became part of the municipality of Lezhë.
