= Alk, Albania =

Alk
- Village
- Location within Albania
- Coordinates: 41°41′N 19°39′E
- Country: Albania
- County: Lezhë
- Municipality: Lezhë
- Administrative unit: Shënkoll
- Time zone: UTC+1 (CET)
  - Summer (DST): UTC+2 (CEST)

Alk is a small village in the former municipality of Shënkoll in the Lezhë County in Albania. At the 2015 local government reform it became part of the municipality Lezhë. It has a population of about 100 inhabitants, not counting the population that resides outside the country.

== History ==
Historically, the first people to inhabit the village was the Zef Nikaj family, who descended from Vukël (former Kelmendi municipality) about the end of the 19th century and beginning of the 20th. Later the family of Gjon Bib Doda, said to be originally from Selca (also former Kelmendi municipality), and families from Trieshi (Municipality of Tuz, today Montenegro) came to the village. The Zef Nikaj family owned the entire land of village. The Gjon Bib Doda family were said to have worked for the Zef Nikaj's. The relationship between the families was always very good. With the "agrarian reform" of 1946, the communist regime expropriated (no compensation) the Zef Nikaj of their land and collectivized it. In the same year, Gjon Vati, of Zef Nikaj family, was executed by the communists without a trial.

In 1991, under law 7501, the government divided the once Zef Nikaj's land equally among all the born inhabitants of the village. The understanding at the time was that this was a temporary situation and that the land will be returned to the legitimate owner (pre-agrarian reform of 1946) once the country transitioned the chaotic economic and political situation deriving from the regime change. As of 2023, the land ownership continues to remain the same as the one decided in 1991.

== Religion ==
The population of Alk was 100% Catholic until the early 1990s when the family of Liman Lokja, originally from Kukës, settled in the village, after having bought the house of Pjeter Vati (brother of Gjon Vati). The Lokja family is Muslim (Sunni). The conviviality is exemplary.

== Geography ==
It is located close to the Mat River. It is 3.5 km from the Adriatic, 16 km from Lezhë and 55.3 km from Tirana. Nearby localities include Tale, Shënkoll, Grykë Lumi, Rrilë, Barbullojë, and Gajush.

== Economy ==
The economy is predominantly agricultural and breeding of sheep, cattle and pigs.
