= Kallmet i Madh =

- Village
- Location within Albania
- Coordinates: 41°50′30″N 19°41′21″E
- Country: Albania
- County: Lezhë
- Municipality: Lezhë
- Administrative unit: Kallmet
- Time zone: UTC+1 (CET)
  - Summer (DST): UTC+2 (CEST)

Kallmet i Madh is a village in Kallmet, a former municipality in the Lezhë County, northwestern Albania. At the 2015 local government reform it became part of the municipality Lezhë.

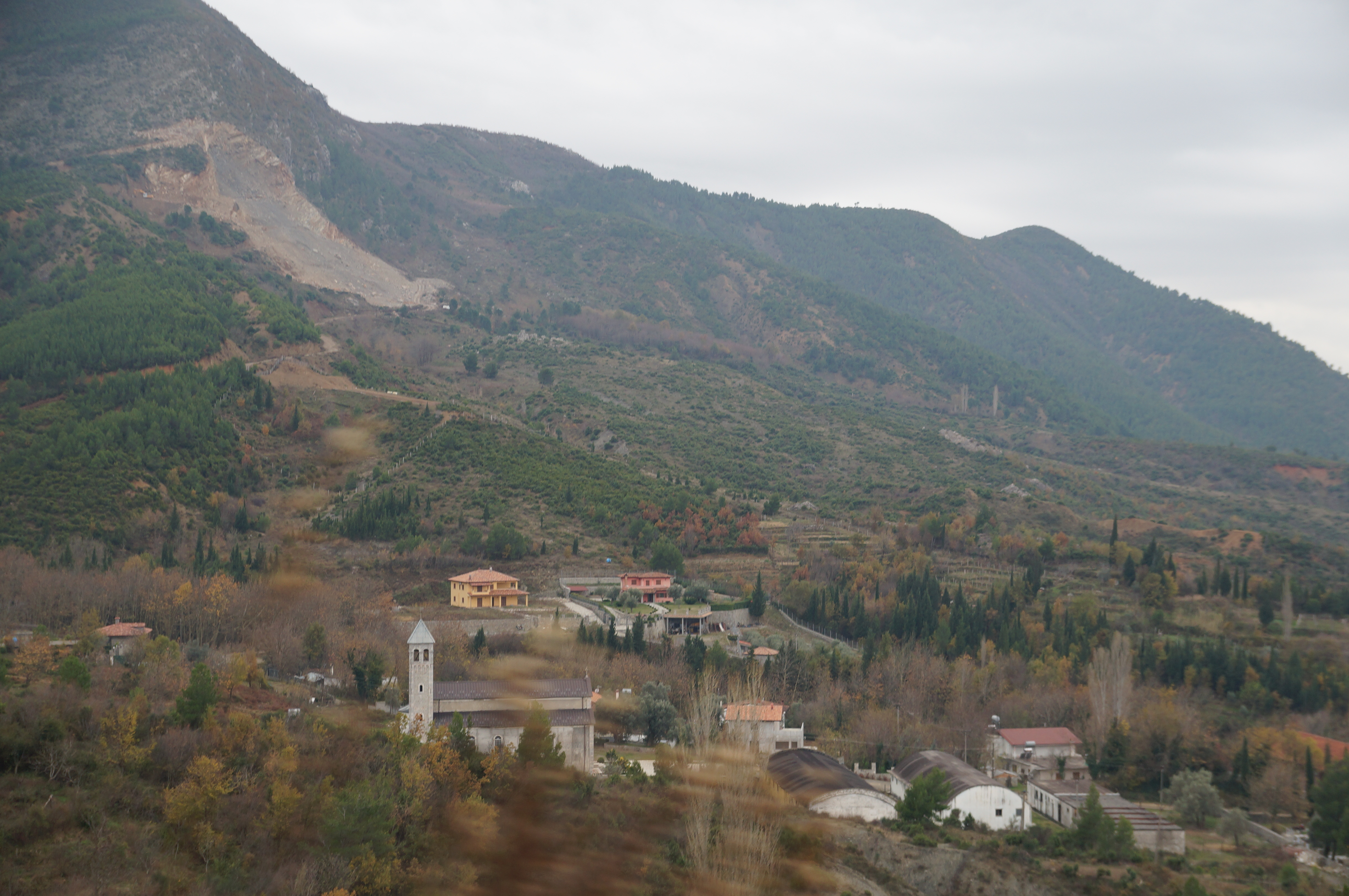
Village church
