= Rraboshtë =

- Village
- Location within Albania
- Coordinates: 41°50′08″N 19°39′49″E
- Country: Albania
- County: Lezhë
- Municipality: Lezhë
- Administrative unit: Kallmet

Population
  - Total: ~1,000
- Time zone: UTC+1 (CET)
  - Summer (DST): UTC+2 (CEST)
- Postal Code: 4504

Rraboshtë is a village located in the former Kallmet municipality, Lezhë County, northwestern Albania. At the 2015 local government reform it became part of the municipality Lezhë. The village is situated near the river Drin, about 4 km north of the city Lezhë. Nearby mountains include Mali Kastriot and Mali i Velës.

In Rraboshtë there is also a church named Te Ngjiturit e Zojës ne Qiell but also a school.

Rraboshta is divided into four main mahalla ("quarter" or "neighbourhood"), that of the Tatej, Pemaj, Ballije, and Mahalla e Poshtme. The majority of brotherhoods descend from Mirdita, the tribal and ethnographic region located to the east of Rraboshtë, with most having arrived from Orosh and Spaç. Examples include the Tatej (Spaçi) and Pemaj (Oroshi). However, there are other minor brotherhoods who trace their ancestry to some of the other regions of northern Albania. The Robi arrived from Dibra in north-eastern Albania while the descendants of Gjon Paloka (the Vokërr Pali) came from Kelmend in Malësia.

The villagers of Rraboshtë are known for their patriotism and for preserving the traditions and customs of the areas where they came from. The traditional dress is the kalmetore and mirditore dress. The inhabitants of this village are usually engaged in agriculture and livestock. They are famous for the production of grape varieties and the cultivation of this product.

== Sources ==
- Coli, Evaristo (2019). Gjenealogjia e fiseve - Kallmet, Rraboshtë dhe Mërqi [Genealogy of tribes – Kallmet, Rraboshtë and Mërqi] (in Albanian). Lezhë: Gjergj Fishta.
