= Gurëz =

- Village
- Location within Albania
- Coordinates: 41°39′58″N 19°38′5″E
- Country: Albania
- County: Lezhë
- Municipality: Kurbin
- Administrative unit: Fushë Kuqe
- Time zone: UTC+1 (CET)
  - Summer (DST): UTC+2 (CEST)

Gurëz is a village in the former Fushë Kuqe Commune, Lezhë County, northwestern Albania. At the 2015 local government reform it became part of the municipality Kurbin.
