= Skanderbeg Memorial =

Coordinates: 41°46′58″N 19°38′36″E

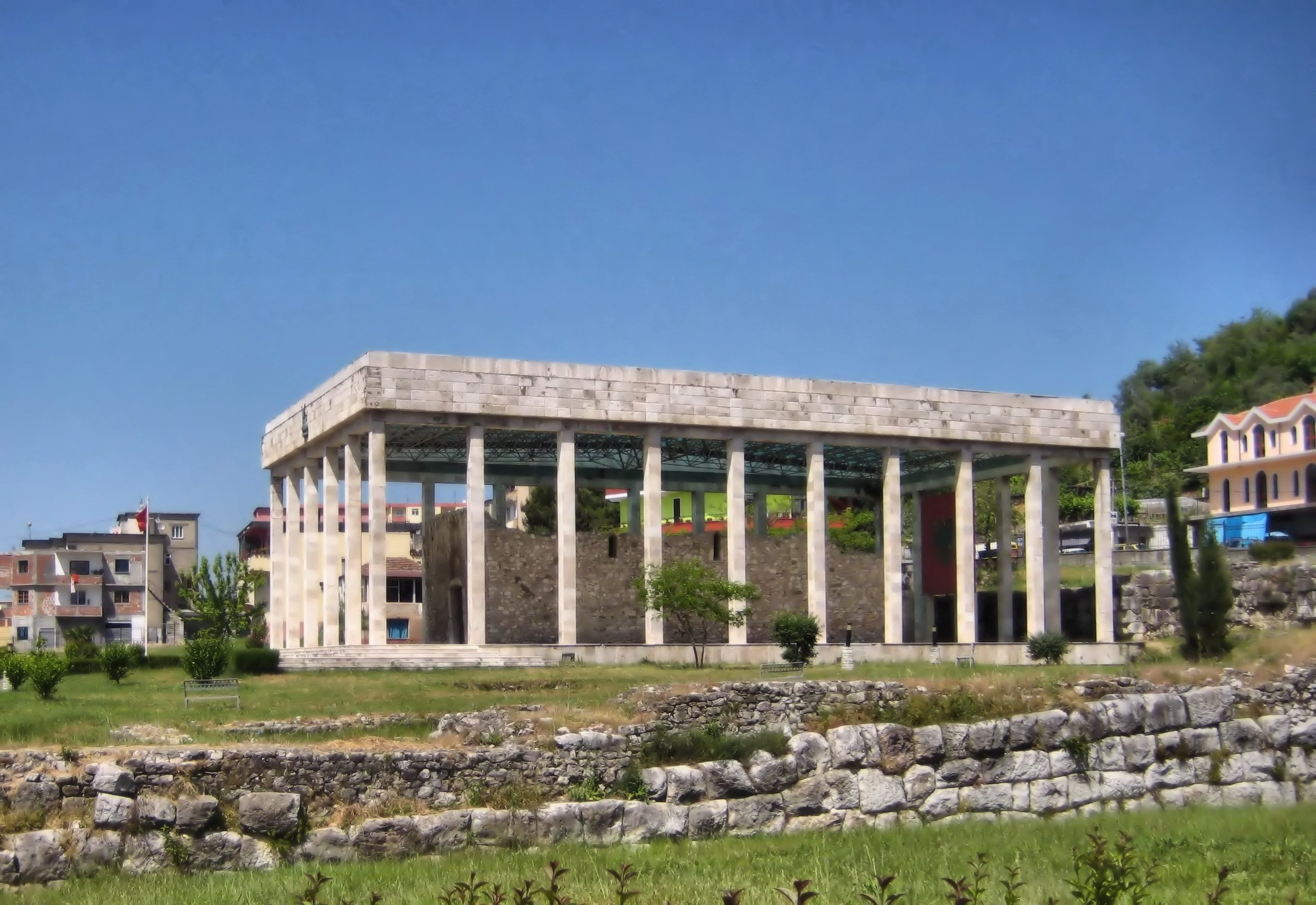
Skanderbeg Memorial

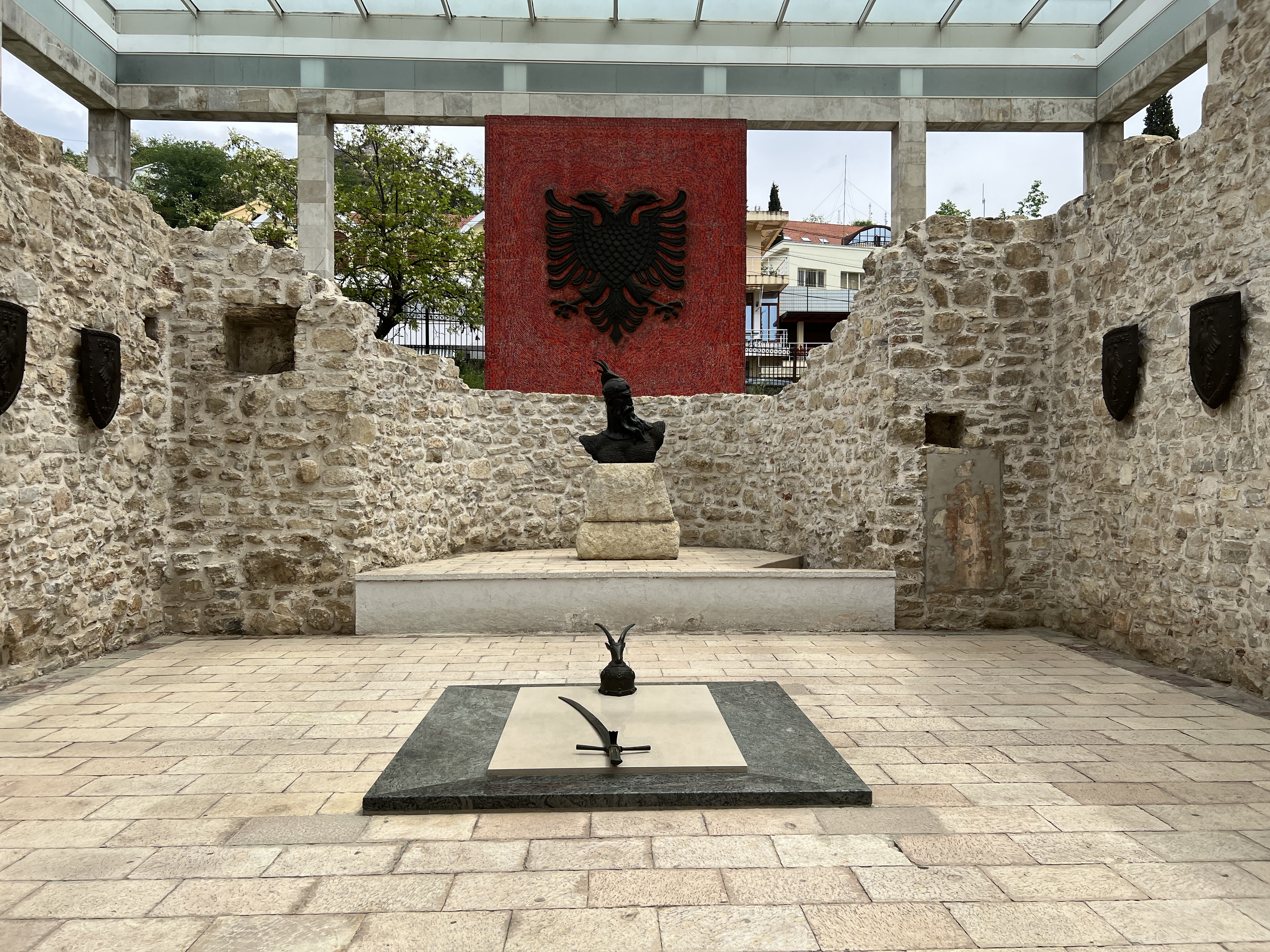
Inside the memorial

Skanderbeg National Memorial is a commemorative site dedicated to Skanderbeg, built in 1981 on the ruins of the Selimiye Mosque in Lezhë.

== History ==
The former Cathedral of Lezhë, dedicated to Saint Nicholas, was a colonial Gothic-style building and was built on foundations of 3rd-century pagan structures. It remained in Christian hands until the last quarter of the 16th century, and in the 1580s, a mosque was built on its site. By the years 1620-1630, this mosque was abandoned and remained in ruins until the late 18th century when it was rebuilt by Sultan Selim III.

Until the Cultural Revolution, the site belonged to the Muslim Community of Albania, serving as a mosque. It later passed into the ownership of the Institute of Monuments in Tirana. The minaret stood until 1978, but it collapsed during the 1979 Montenegro earthquake.

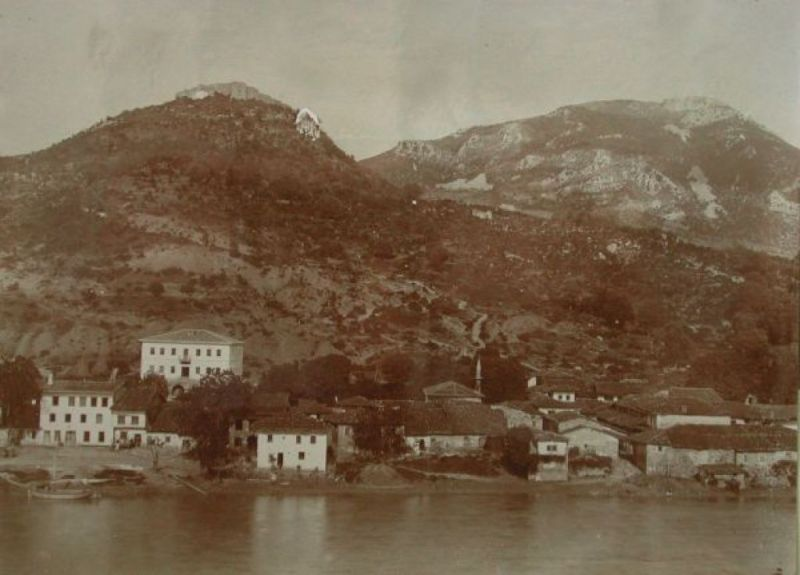
Selimiye Mosque in the early 20th century, photo by Antonio Baldacci.

Excavations conducted in 1968 uncovered the remains of a 15th-century cathedral. Led by archaeologists Frano Prendi and Koço Zheku, the findings were thought to be the ruins of St. Nicholas Cathedral, although historian Kristo Frashëri disputed this claim. Further excavations revealed foundations of 3rd-century pagan structures, early Christian baptisteries from the first half of the 6th century, and two phases of Byzantine church construction.

During the city's reconstruction after the 1979 earthquake, it was decided to remove the Ottoman layer and transform the foundations of the old church into a grand modern monument. Construction work continued in the following years and was completed in 1981 or shortly before 1983.

== Türbe and Bektashi graves ==
According to Austro-Hungarian consul Theodor Anton Ippen in the Shkodër Vilayet, near the eastern gate of the Lezhë Castle, there were the graves of the Mlikaj beys of Lezhë and a turbe of a forgotten wali. Historian Kristo Frashëri, in his book Skanderbeg: Life and Work, recounts a possible visit by traveler R.C. Woodville Jr. to Lezhë during the League of Prizren (1880). Woodville published an illustration in Scribner’s Monthly titled "Tomb of Scanderbeg at Alessio." The drawing depicts a turbe for Skanderbeg with two guards—one dressed in traditional trousers and the other in a fustanella. According to popular tradition, this turbe was guarded by Bektashi dervishes. Frashëri, contrary to Prendi’s narrative, believed the tomb was located in Lezhë Castle.
