= Gajush =

- Village
- Location within Albania
- Coordinates: 41°41′53.1″N 19°40′08.4″E
- Country: Albania
- County: Lezhë
- Municipality: Lezhë
- Administrative unit: Shënkoll
- Time zone: UTC+1 (CET)
  - Summer (DST): UTC+2 (CEST)

Gajush is a village in the Lezhë County, north-western Albania. Following the local government reform of 2015, Gajush became a part of the municipality of Lezhë and is under the municipal unit of Shënkoll.

== Demographic History ==
Gajush (Gajpi) is attested in the Ottoman defter of 1467 as a hass-ı mir-liva property in the vilayet of Dimitri Gjonima. The total number of households present in the settlement is missing, however, the following household heads are recorded: Gjon Bardi, Pal Dida, Lesh Trasha, Lumsha Aleksi, and Gjin Slani.
