= Barbullojë =

- Village
- Location within Albania
- Coordinates: 41°43′51″N 19°37′45″E
- Country: Albania
- County: Lezhë
- Municipality: Lezhë
- Administrative unit: Shënkoll
- Time zone: UTC+1 (CET)
  - Summer (DST): UTC+2 (CEST)
- Postal Code: 4500

Barbullojë is a settlement in the Lezhë County, northwestern Albania. It is part of the former municipality, Shënkoll. At the 2015 local government reform it became part of the municipality Lezhë.
