= Kolsh =

Kolsh may refer to two villages in Albania:

- Kolsh, Kukës, in the Kukës municipality
- Kolsh, Lezhë, in the Lezhë municipality
