= List of mayors of Lezhë =

This is a list of mayors of Lezhë who have served since the Albanian Declaration of Independence of 1912.

== Mayors (1992–present) ==
No.	Name	Term in office	
1	Agron Dibra	1992	1996
2	Njazi Reçi	1996	2000
3	Gjokë Jaku	2000	2006
4	Viktor Tushaj	2007	2015
5	Fran Frrokaj	2015	2019
6	Pjerin Ndreu	2019	Incumbent

== See also ==
- Politics of Albania
