= Talë =

Tale Talë
- Village
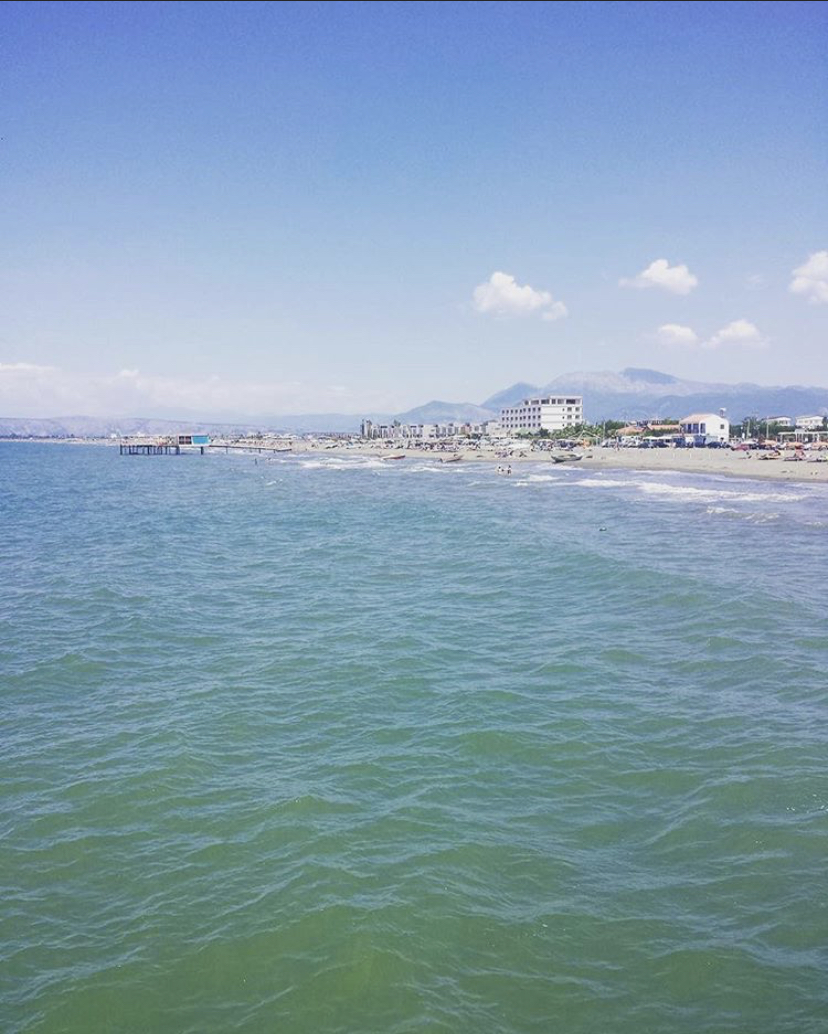

- Location within Albania
- Coordinates: 41°41′N 19°37′E
- Country: Albania
- County: Lezhë
- Municipality: Lezhë
- Administrative unit: Shënkoll

Area
  - Total: 0.43 km^{2} (0.17 sq mi)
- Time zone: UTC+1 (CET)
  - Summer (DST): UTC+2 (CEST)

Talë is a seaside resort town, part of the former municipality of Shënkoll in the Lezhë County in Albania. At the 2015 local government reform, it became part of the municipality Lezhë. Its beaches attract many tourists, especially with the increase in small local hotels.
