= Villages of Lezhë County =

The Lezhë County in northwestern Albania is subdivided into 3 municipalities. These municipalities contain 180 towns and villages:
