= Mamurras =

- Administrative unit
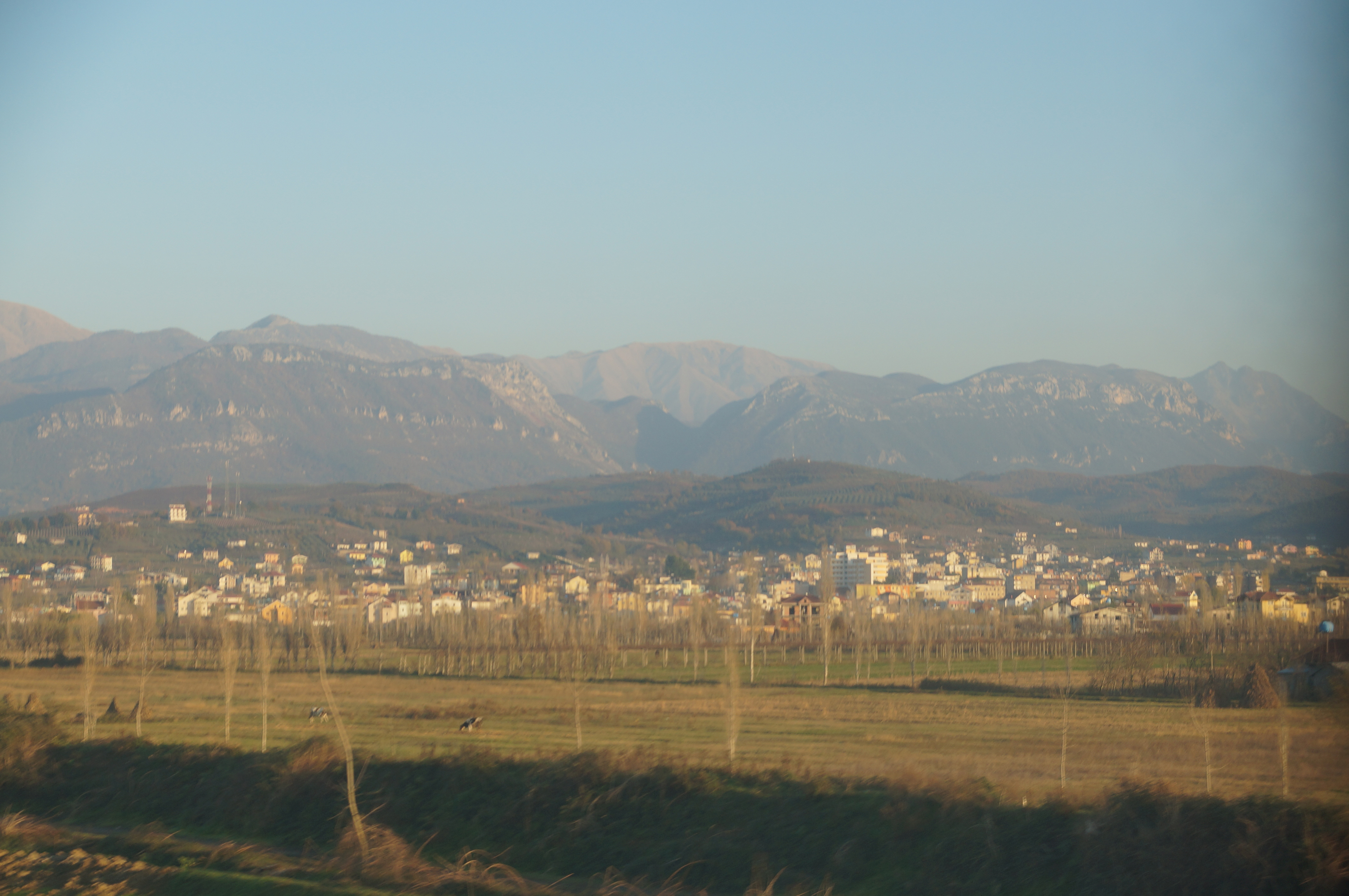
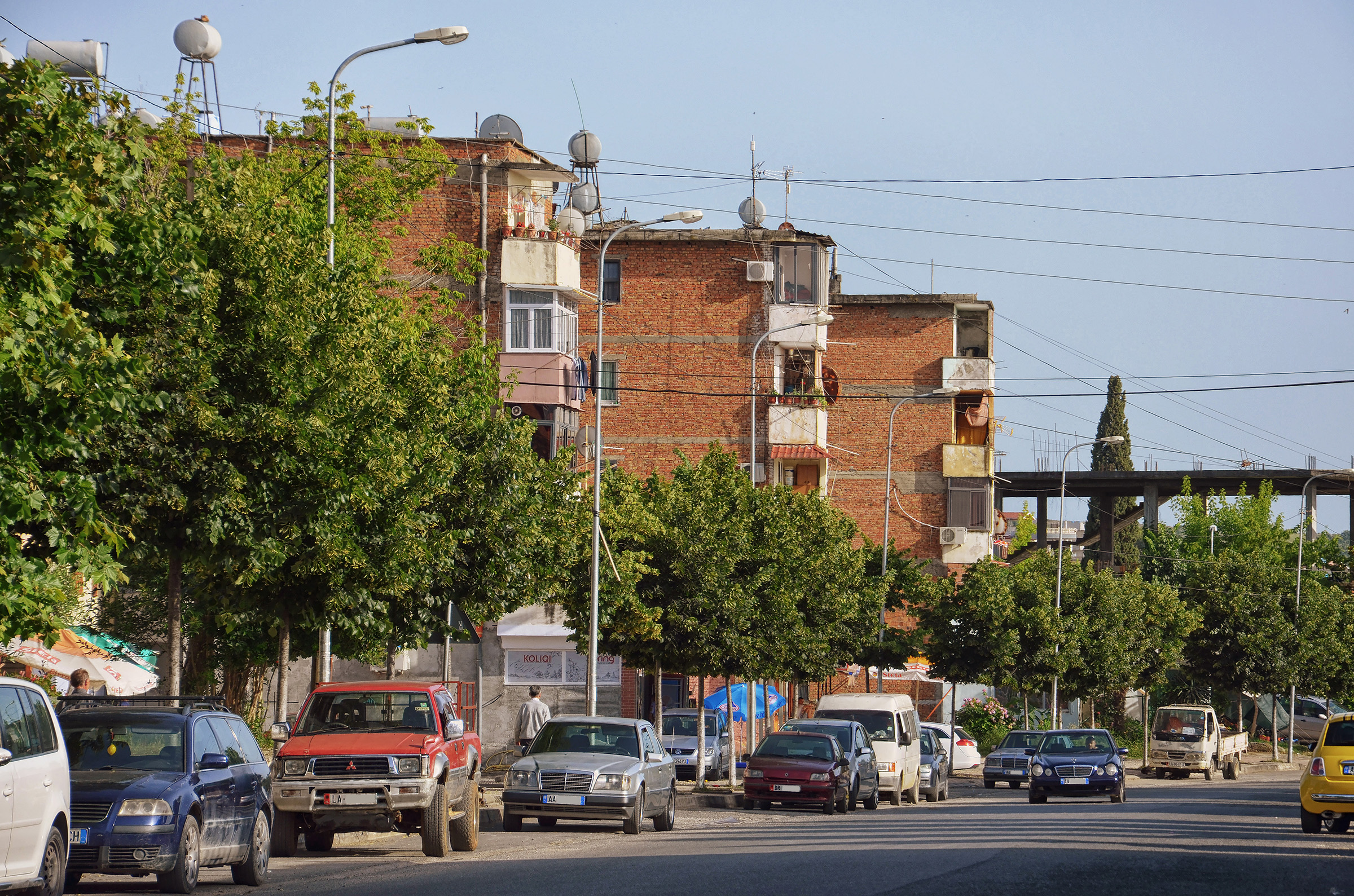
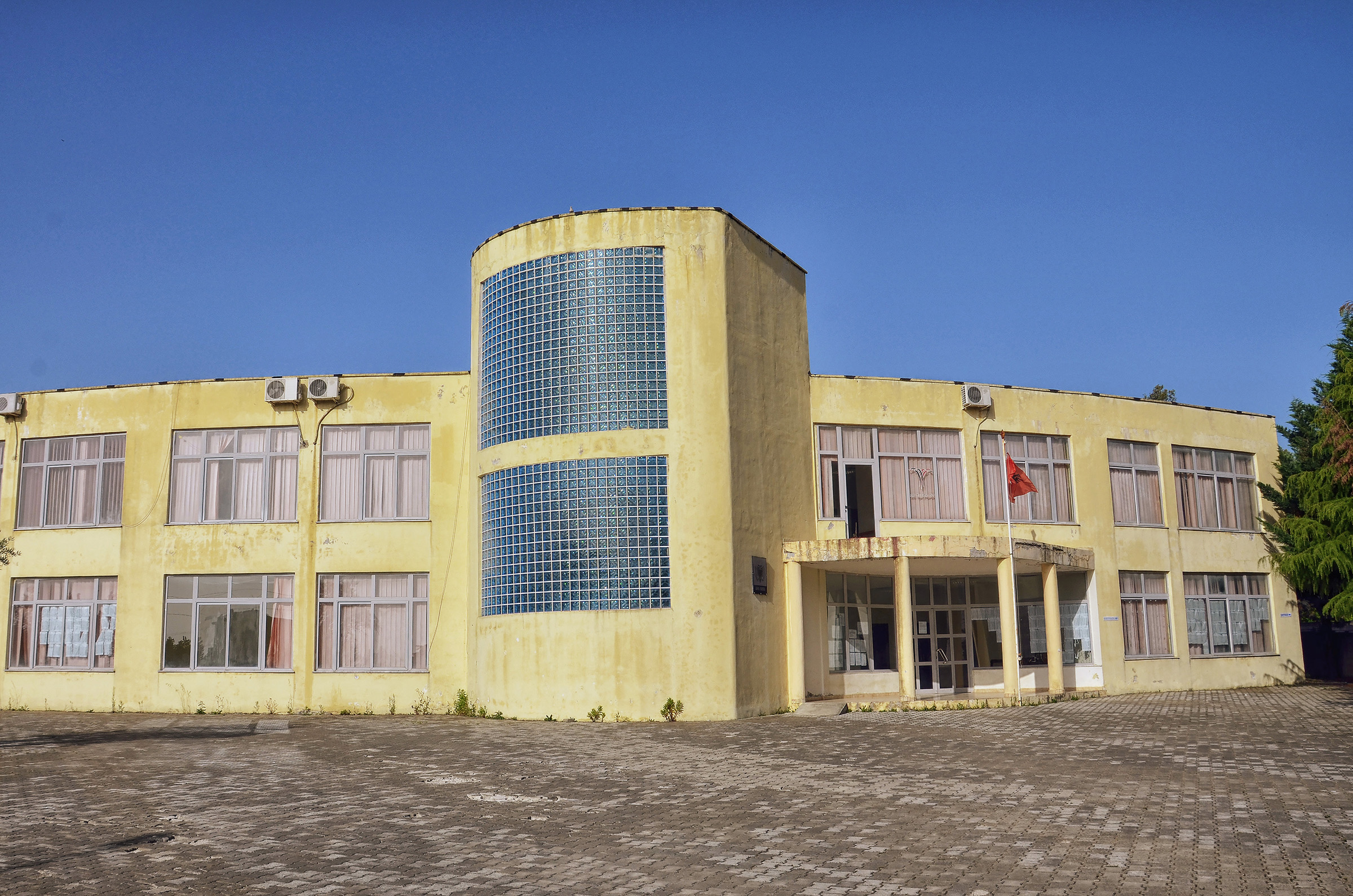
- From the top, Distant View of Mamurras, Town centre, Town Hall

- Location within Albania
- Coordinates: 41°35′N 19°42′E
- Country: Albania
- County: Lezhë
- Municipality: Kurbin
  - Administrative unit: 75.7 km^{2} (29.2 sq mi)

Population (2023)
  - Administrative unit: 11,442
  - Administrative unit density: 151/km^{2} (391/sq mi)
- Time zone: UTC+1 (CET)
  - Summer (DST): UTC+2 (CEST)
- Postal Code: 4704

Mamurras (Albanian definite form: Mamurrasi) is a town and a former municipality in Lezhë County, northwestern Albania. At the 2015 local government reform it became a subdivision of the municipality Kurbin. The population at the 2023 census was 11,442.

Historical population
Year	Pop.	±%
1989	14,826	—
2001	17,676	+19.2%
2011	15,284	−13.5%
2023	11,442	−25.1%

The town lies 8 kilometers (5.0 mi) from the Mediterranean Sea.
