= St. Nicholas Church, Lezhë =

Ruined former church; former mosque in Lezhë, Albania

St. Nicholas Church; Selimije Mosque; Skanderbeg National Memorial
- Kisha e Shën Nikollës; Xhamia e Selimies
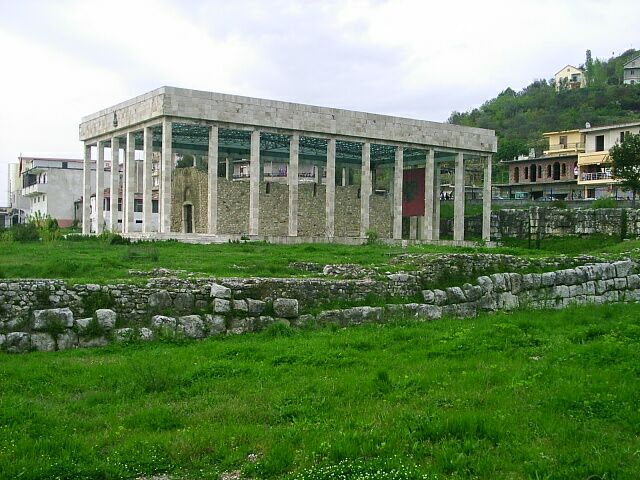
- Remains of the former mosque inside the mausoleum / church

- Location of the former church-mosque in Albania

Religion
- Affiliation: Roman Catholicism (former); Islam (former)
- Ecclesiastical or organisational status: Temple and church; (c. 1st century BC–1478); Mosque; (1478–c. 1967); Mausoleum / Monument; (since 1981)
- Status: Inactive (church-mosque) (partial ruinous state); Active (mausoleum-monument)

Location
- Location: Lezhë
- Country: Albania
- Interactive map of: St. Nicholas Church; Selimije Mosque; Skanderbeg National Memorial
- Coordinates: 41°46′57″N 19°38′35″E

Architecture
- Completed: c. 1st century BC; (as a church); c. 15th century; (as a mosque); 1981 (as a mausoleum)
- Destroyed: c. 1967 (partial destruction)

Specifications
- Minaret: 1 (since destroyed)
- Shrine: 1: (Skanderbeg)
- Materials: Stone; marble

Cultural Monument of Albania
- Official name: Skanderbeg Memorial, Lezhë
- Reference no.: LE012

The St. Nicholas Church (Albanian: Kisha e Shën Nikollës, Kisha e Shna Kollit), also known as the Selimije Mosque (Albanian: Xhamia e Selimies), the Church-Mosque of Lezhë (Kisha-Xhami), and, since the 1980s, as the Skanderbeg Memorial, is a former temple and subsequently a Catholic church and a former Islamic mosque, and now a mausoleum and monument that contains the remains of Skanderbeg. The structure is located in Lezhë, Albania. Likely to have been established in c. 1st century BC, the building was repurposed as a church and then as a mosque after 1478. The mosque got partially destroyed by the Communist dictatorship in c. 1967, and again repurposed as a mausoleum in 1981. The structure is thus now in a ruinous state. The site was designated as a Cultural Monument of Albania.

== History ==
Originally built as a pagan stone structure in the 1st century BC, it was later named after Saint Nicholas. A fresco of the saint is present in the former church apse, although heavily damaged. It was located in the interior part of an Illyrian city which was later reconstructed by the Romans, in the 1st century BC. The "Gaviarius" (Gaviarivs) Stone in front of the entrance provides evidence of the building's history, unearthed during archaeological excavations by Frano Prendi and Koço Zheku between 1975 and 1980.

The League of Lezhë was formed in the grounds of the then church in 1444.

=== As a mosque ===
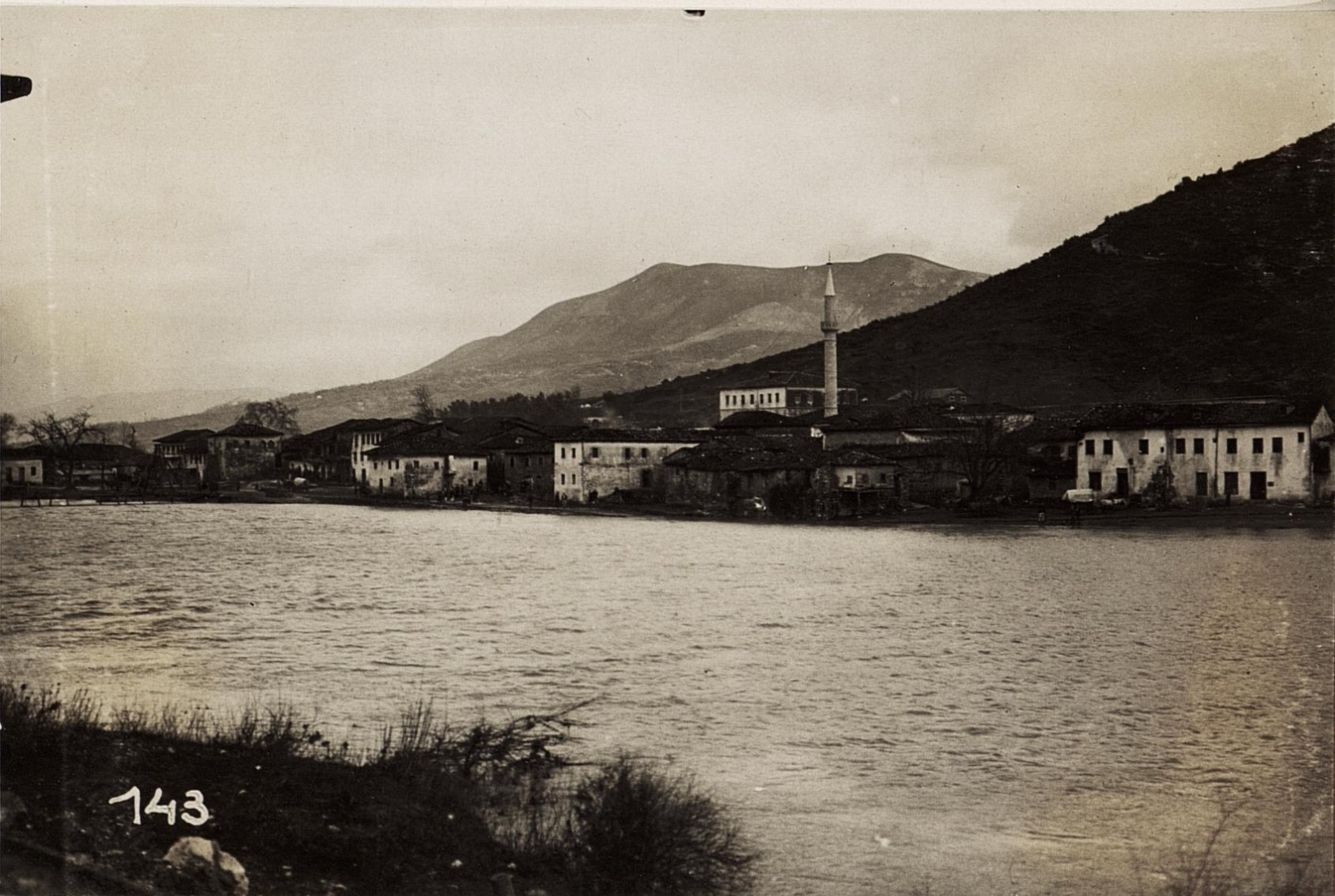
The original Selimie mosque in 1917

When the Ottoman Turks conquered Albania, the church was plundered in 1478, and they turned it into a mosque by adding a dikka, a mihrab and a large minaret. The mosque was named after the Ottoman Sultan Selim I. The trouble that Skanderbeg caused to the Ottoman Empire's military forces was such that when the Ottomans found the grave of Skanderbeg in the church they opened it and made amulets of his bones, believing that these would confer bravery on the wearer. The St. Nicholas' Church was rebuilt by the Ottomans elsewhere in return as a gesture of tolerance towards Christians. By the years 1620-1630, the Selimie mosque was abandoned and remained in ruins until the late 18th century when it was rebuilt by Sultan Selim III.

The Selimiye Mosque was one of the last buildings from the Middle Ages in Lezhë and did not survive during the Communist dictatorship of Enver Hoxha, who destroyed all mosques in Lezhë. The site was taken from the Muslim Community of Albania and excavations were made. The minaret of the Selimie Mosque was torn down. Led by archaeologists Frano Prendi and Koço Zheku, the findings were thought to be the ruins of St. Nicholas Church, although historian Kristo Frashëri disputed this claim. Further excavations revealed foundations of 3rd-century pagan structures on this site.

=== As a monument ===
After getting ruined on purpose, in 1968, for the 500th anniversary of Skanderbeg's death, a memorial was established around the former mosque. In 1981, the National Memorial opened on the site and contains relics of his battles. Following significant water damage, restoration of the mausoleum commenced in 2018.

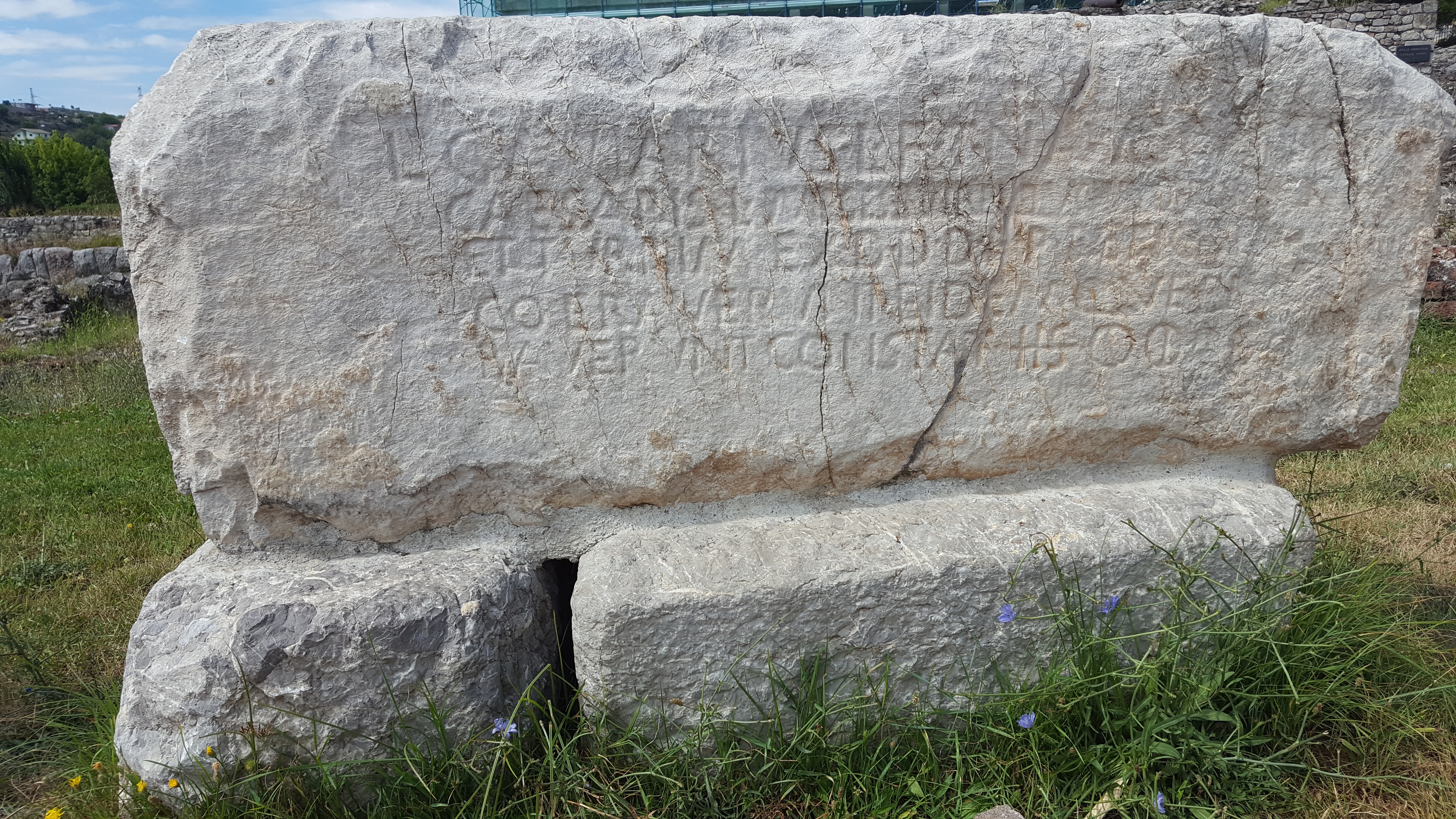
The "Gaviarivs" engraved stone at the entrance of the castle

== See also ==
- Roman Catholicism in Albania
- Islam in Albania
- List of mosques in Albania
- List of Religious Cultural Monuments of Albania
