= Pjerin Ndreu =

Albanian politician (born 1966)

Mayor of Lezhë
- Incumbent
- Assumed office August 2019
- Preceded by: Fran Frrokaj

Member of the Albanian Parliament
- In office June 2013 – May 2019
- Constituency: Lezhë County

Personal details
- Born: December 12, 1966 (age 59) Pukë, PSR Albania
- Party: Socialist Party of Albania
- Education: University of Tirana
- Occupation: Politician, former police officer
- Awards: Medal of Appreciation (2003)

Military service
- Rank: Chief Commissioner of Albanian State Police

Pjerin Ndreu (born December 12, 1966) is an Albanian politician and former police official who has served as Mayor of Lezhë since August 2019. He was previously a member of the Albanian Parliament from 2013 to 2019 and held numerous senior positions in the Albanian State Police.

== Early life and education ==
Ndreu was born in the town of Pukë, then part of the People's Socialist Republic of Albania. In 1988, he graduated from the Higher Police School of the Ministry of Interior and began working as a criminal police inspector in Lezhë. He later completed his law degree at the University of Tirana.

== Police career ==
Ndreu held several key positions within the Albanian police system during the 1990s and early 2000s. He served as head of police commissariats in Lezhë and Tirana (Commissariat No.1), as well as Director of the Regional Police Directorates in Shkodër and Gjirokastër. Between 2002 and 2004, he was appointed Deputy General Director of the State Police and later Director of the Tirana Regional Police.

He holds the police rank of Chief Commissioner (Kryekomisar) and was awarded the Medal of Gratitude (Medalja e Mirënjohjes) by the President of Albania in 2003 for his service.

Ndreu also worked as a lecturer in criminology and criminalistics at the "Justiniani I" Faculty of Law from 2007 to 2013. He attended several professional training programs in countries such as Germany, Canada, and the United Kingdom, including at Oxford and through ICITAP.

== Political career ==
Ndreu entered politics with the Socialist Party of Albania and was elected to the Parliament of Albania in June 2013. He served until 2019, participating in legislative and oversight duties. In August 2019, he was elected Mayor of Lezhë, a position he currently holds.
