= Shënkoll =

- Administrative unit
- Location within Albania
- Coordinates: 41°41′N 19°39′E
- Country: Albania
- County: Lezhë
- Municipality: Lezhë

Population (2023)
  - Administrative unit: 10,153
- Time zone: UTC+1 (CET)
  - Summer (DST): UTC+2 (CEST)

Shënkoll (Albanian for St. Nicholas) is a village and a former municipality in the Lezhë County, northwestern Albania. At the 2015 local government reform it became a subdivision of the municipality Lezhë. The population at the 2023 census was 10,153.

== Geography ==
Shënkoll is a rapidly developing village situated 10 km south of the town of Lezhë, near the mouth of the river Mat.

== History ==
=== Families ===
Shënkoll is inhabited by a number of brotherhoods and families who trace their ancestry back to the Malësia ethnographic region situated in the extreme north of Albania as well as in eastern Montenegro. The vast majority of families originate from the historical Kelmendi tribe and arrived during the early nineteenth century. The families of Shënkoll include the:

- Turkaj: The Turkaj trace their ancestry to Turk Vuksani who was the bajraktar of Nikç, Kelmend, and the first of this line to settle in Shënkoll. Turk Vuksani fathered two sons born in Shënkoll, Kaçel born in ca. 1820, and Llan born in ca. 1840.
- Cokaj: The Cokaj (or Coku) are descended from Cok Preka who was born in ca. 1810 in the village of Broja, a part of the Nikç bajrak of Kelmendi. Early on in his life Cok Preka would leave his home village and, originally, base himself and his herds in Shënkoll for the winter, still keeping his shepherd huts in the highlands of Kelmend. Consequently, Preka would father seven children born in Shënkoll. From his first wife he fathered a son named Mash and a daughter named Curra. Due to his wife's death, Preka remarried and fathered five more children with Lula, the daughter of Kaçel Doda from Kastrati: the sons were Gjeto, Deda, and Pjetri; while the daughters were Tringa and Prena.
- Djalaj: The Djalaj arrived in Shënkoll from Nikç, Kelmend, during the 1820s.
- Dembacaj
- Radaj
- Nik Daka: The Nik Daka stem from Marash Prek Pllumi who was from the Vocaj of Broja, Kelmend, and had a son named Dak Marashi. Dak Marashi would be among the Albanian highlanders to settle in Shënkoll and the surrounding area during the early nineteenth century as a result of new privileges granted by the authorities, allowing them to shelter their herds in the lowlands during the winter. Dak Marashi would father two sons, Nik and Mark Daka. It is from the first son that this family descend and take their name. Nik Daka would consequently also father two sons named Llesh and Martin.
- Kadri Keqi: This family derive their name from their ancestor bearing the same name. They originate from Nikç in Kelmend.

== Localities ==
- Alk
- Barbullojë
- Gajush
- Grykë Lumi
- Rilë
- Tale 1
- Tale 2

== Sources ==
Uci, Mark (2017). Lezha, tempulli i historisë kombëtare. Lezhë, Albania: Gjergj Fishta.
