= Fushë Kuqe =

- Administrative unit
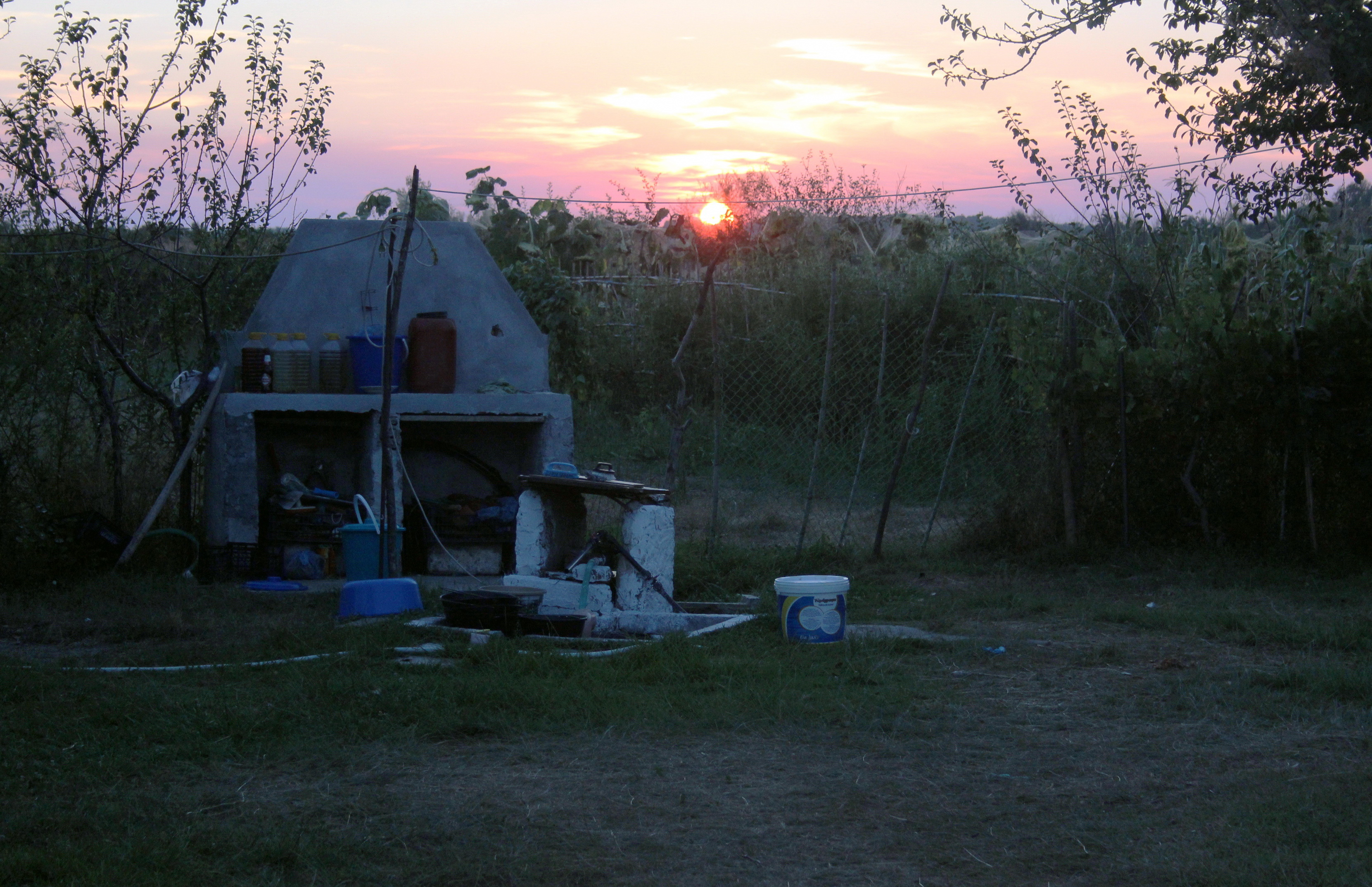
- The sunset in Fushë Kuqe village

- Location within Albania
- Coordinates: 41°38′N 19°37′E
- Country: Albania
- County: Lezhë
- Municipality: Kurbin

Population (2023)
  - Administrative unit: 3,916
- Time zone: UTC+1 (CET)
  - Summer (DST): UTC+2 (CEST)

Fushë Kuqe is a village and a former municipality in the Lezhë County, northwestern Albania. At the 2015 local government reform it became a subdivision of the municipality Kurbin. The population at the 2023 census was 3,916.

The etymology of Fushë Kuqe from the Albanian language translates into English as “Red Field”.
