= Kurbin =

- Municipality
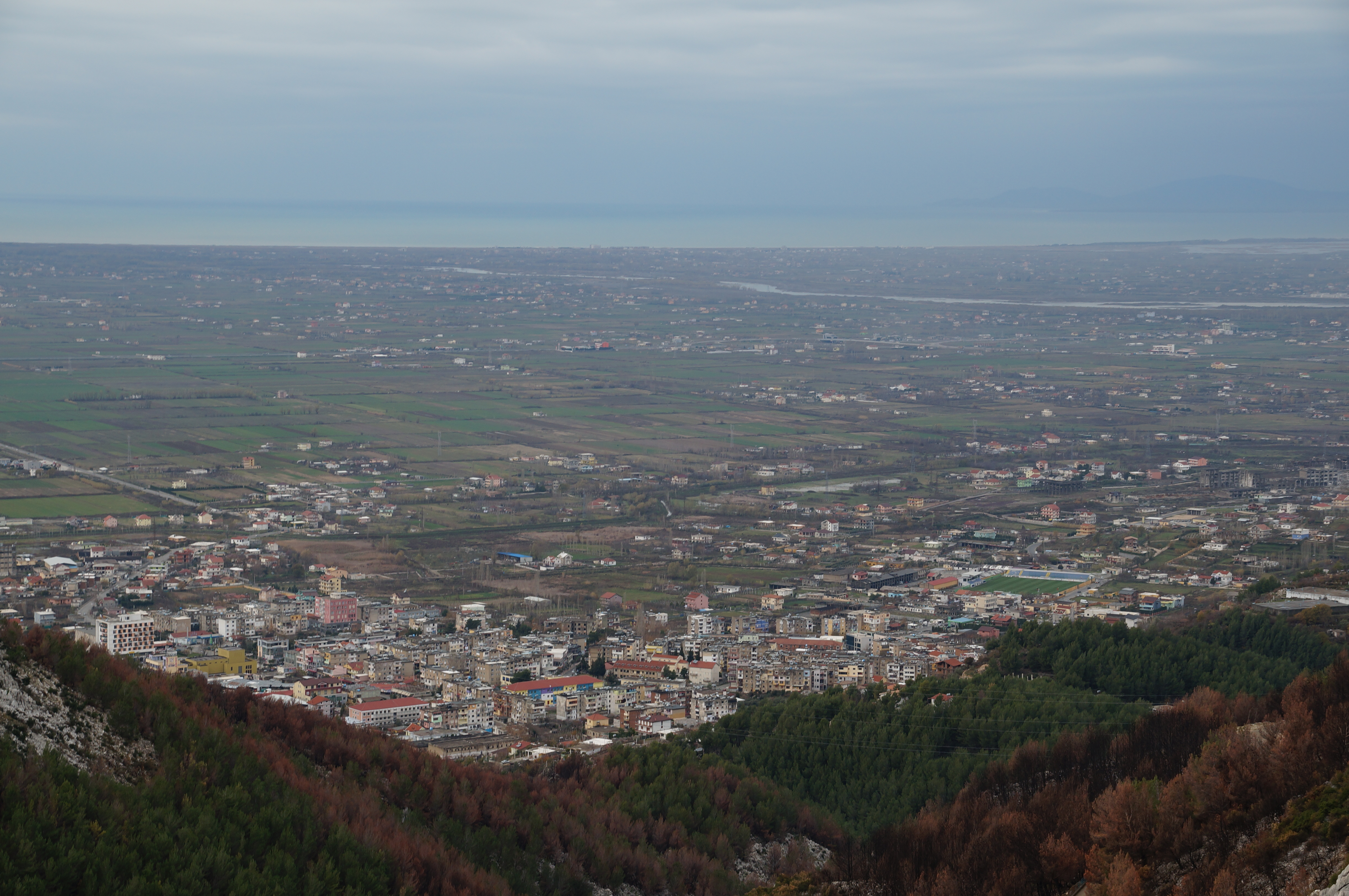
- View of Kurbin

- Emblem

- Location within Albania
- Coordinates: 41°38′N 19°43′E
- Country: Albania
- County: Lezhë

Government
  - Mayor: Majlinda Cara (PS)

Area
  - Municipality: 276.25 km^{2} (106.66 sq mi)
- Elevation: 234 m (768 ft)

Population (2023)
  - Municipality: 34,405
  - Municipality density: 124.54/km^{2} (322.56/sq mi)
- Time zone: UTC+1 (CET)
  - Summer (DST): UTC+2 (CEST)
- Postal Code: 4701-4702
- Area Code: (0)53
- Website: www.bashkiakurbin.gov.al

Kurbin is a municipality in Lezhë County, northwestern Albania. It was created in 2015 by the merger of the former municipalities Fushë Kuqe, Laç, Mamurras and Milot. The seat of the municipality is the town Laç. The total population at the 2023 census was 34,405, in a total area of 276.25 km^{2}. It is coterminous with the former Kurbin District.

== Etymology ==
The Latin form of the place was Corvinus which makes a relationship between the place and the Latin word Corvus (raven) possible.

== History ==
Kurbin is recorded in the Ottoman defter of 1467 as a hass-ı mir-liva property in the vilayet of Kurbin. The settlement had only five households represented by the following household heads: Pal Marku, Gjon Sakati, Peter Smaka, Gjergj Balshi, and Peter Manesi. The settlements of Delbnisht (recorded as Dhulbnishti), Laç, Breshat, Kaçula, Mali i Bardhë (recorded as Malibard), Selita, Gallatë (recorded as Galata), Likapaji or Lugapaçi (modern Dauli), Smaka, and Madhësh all belonged to the vilayet of Kurbin.

== Notable people ==
- Paskal Trokshi – Religious figure.
- Prenk Pervizi – Albanian General.
