= Lezhë Castle =

Castle in Albania

- Albanian: Kalaja e Lezhës
- Lezhë, in northern Albania
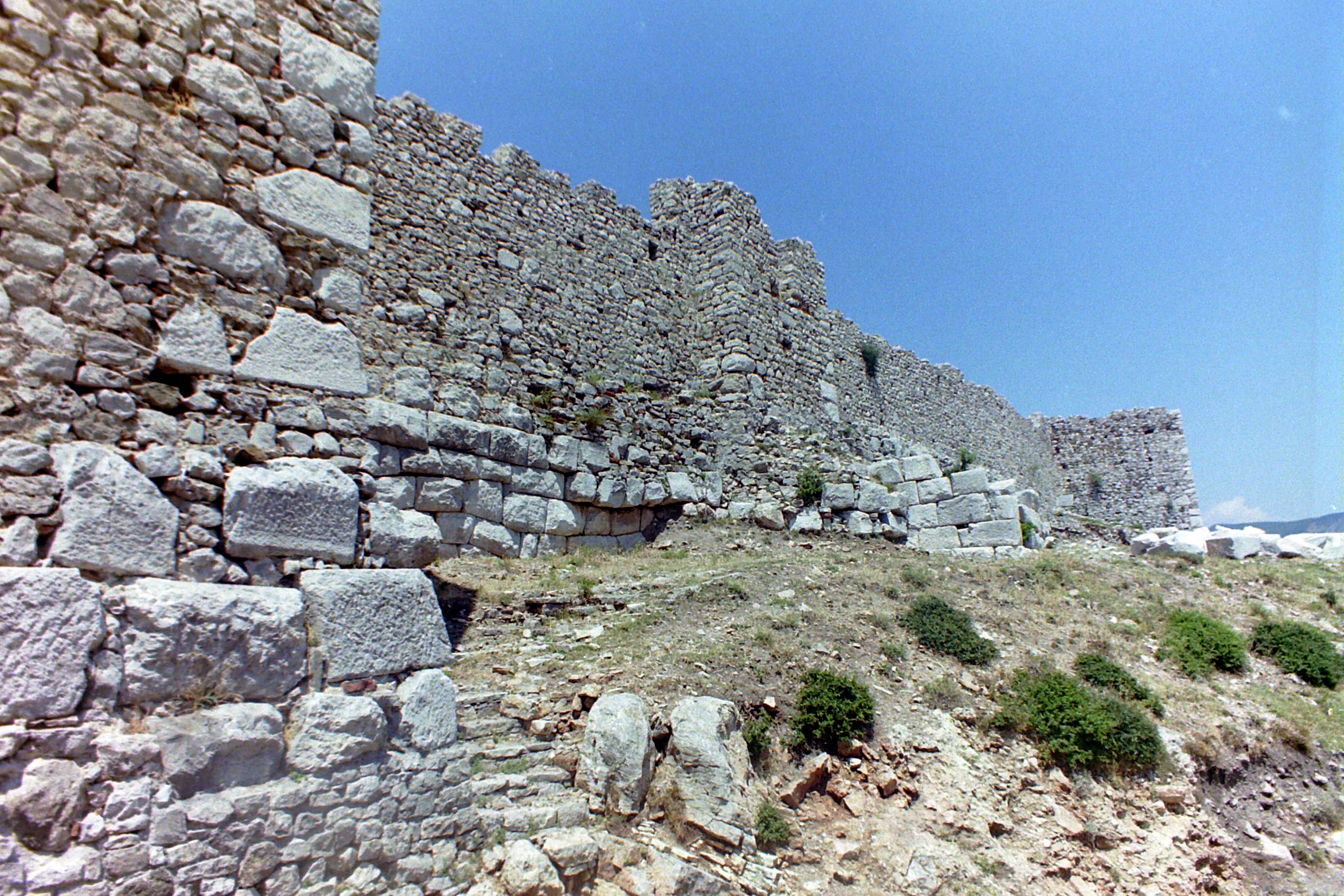
- Lezhë Castle in 1995

Site information
- Owner: Albania
- Controlled by: Illyrian tribes Roman Empire; Byzantine Empire; Principality of Dukagjini; Republic of Venice; Ottoman Empire; Albania
- Open to the public: Yes

Location
- Location within Albania
- Coordinates: 41.783611°N 19.649722°E

Site history
- Built: Unknown foundation date, castle rebuilt by Venetians in 1440, and Ottomans 1522

The Lezhë Castle (Albanian: Kalaja e Lezhës) is a castle dominating the city of Lezhë, northern Albania. Its highest point is 186 metres (610 ft). Lezhë Castle is at an elevation of 322 metres (1,056 ft). Lezhë Castle began as a Illyrian fortification. The earliest events where the name of Lissus appears to relate to the foundation of a Parian-Sicilian colony in the island of Pharos (modern Hvar) and the alliance of 385 B.C.E. between the Illyrian king Bardylis and Dionysius I the Elder, tyrant of Syracuse during 405 B.C.E. – 367 B.C.E. In this context Diodorus writes the following:

“He [Dionysius I] had already dispatched a colony to the Adriatic not many years previously and had founded the city known as Lissus” (Diodorus, XV, 13).

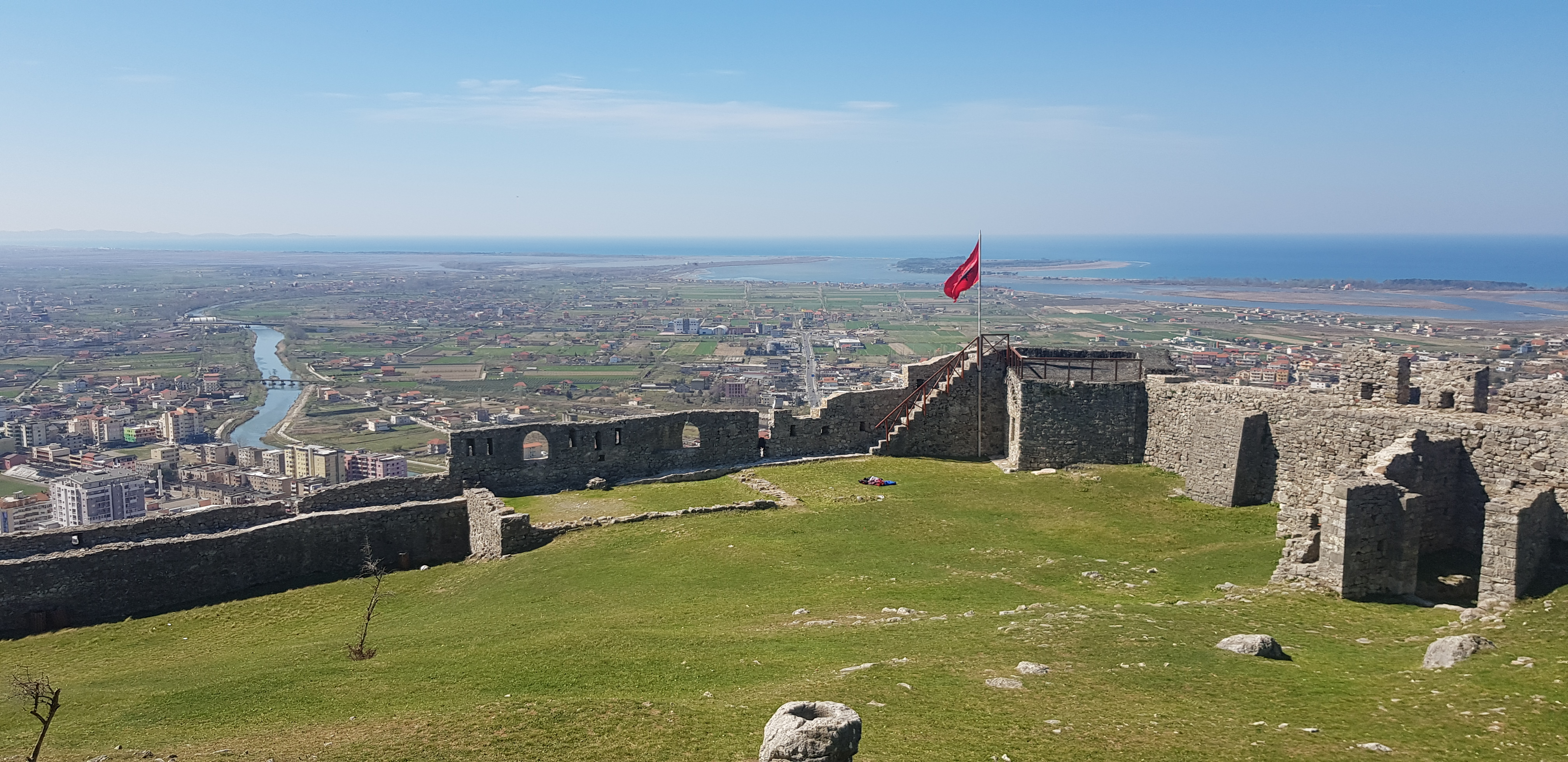
View on the inside of the castle

== See also ==
- Lezhë
- List of castles in Albania
- Tourism in Albania

== Sources ==
- Malaj, Edmond (2016). "The Noble Dukagjinis during the Middle Ages. Their Territories and some Characteristics". Studime Historike. 1–2: 10.
- Galaty, Michael; Lafe, Ols; Lee, Wayne; Tafilica, Zamir (2013). Light and Shadow: Isolation and Interaction in the Shala Valley of Northern Albania. The Cotsen Institute of Archaeology Press. ISBN 978-1931745710.
