= Kallmet =

- Administrative unit
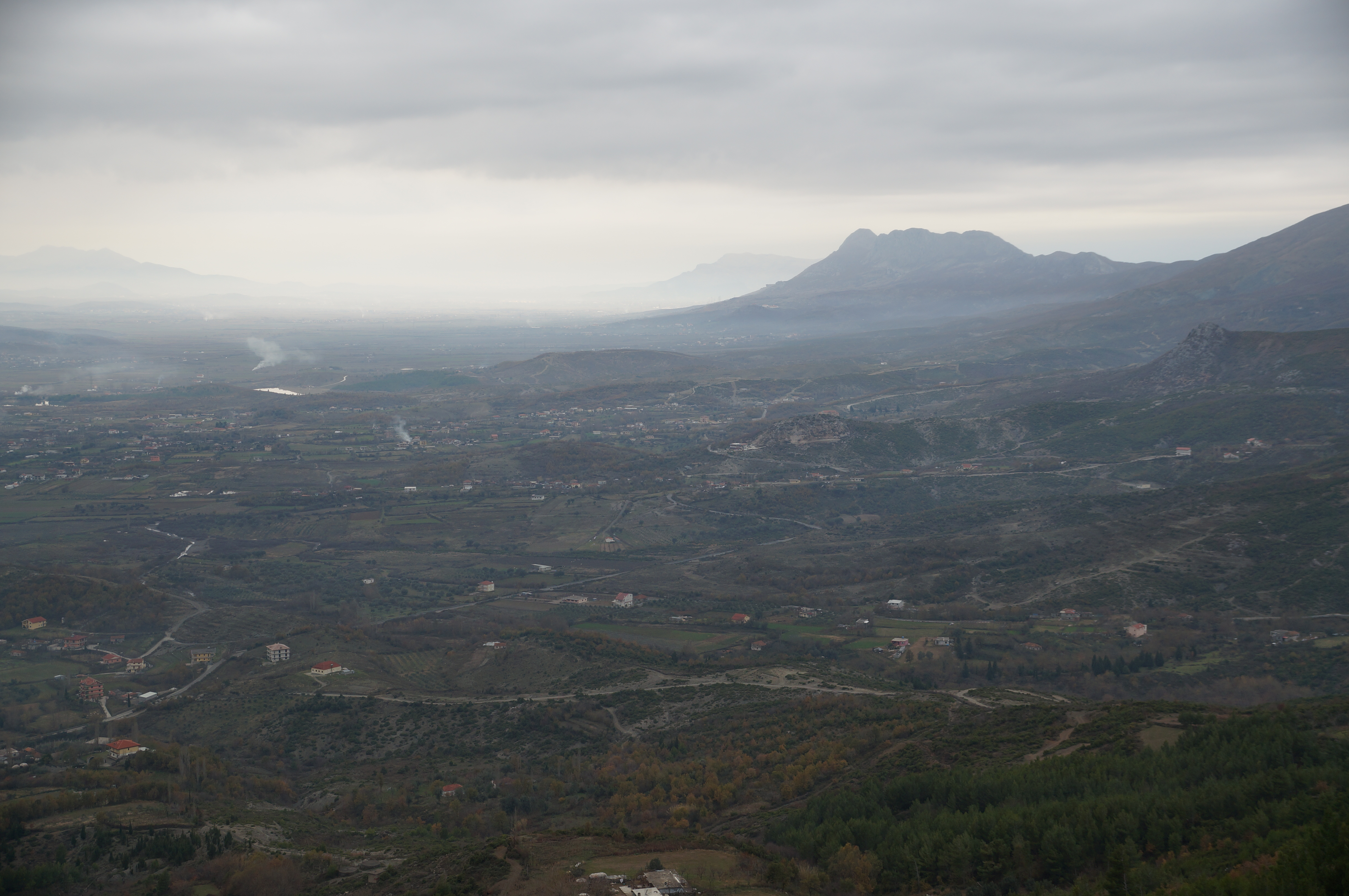
- Kallmet village

- Location within Albania
- Coordinates: 41°50′51″N 19°41′24″E
- Country: Albania
- County: Lezhë
- Municipality: Lezhë

Population (2023)
  - Administrative unit: 2,973
- Time zone: UTC+1 (CET)
  - Summer (DST): UTC+2 (CEST)
- Website: www.komunakallmet.com

Kallmet is a former municipality in the Lezhë County, northwestern Albania. At the 2015 local government reform it became a subdivision of the municipality Lezhë. The population at the 2023 census was 2,973.
