= Kolsh, Lezhë =

Kolsh
- Administrative unit
- Location within Albania
- Coordinates: 41°46′44″N 19°40′19″E
- Country: Albania
- County: Lezhë
- Municipality: Lezhë

Population (2023)
  - Administrative unit: 3,817
- Time zone: UTC+1 (CET)
  - Summer (DST): UTC+2 (CEST)

Kolsh is a village and a former municipality in the Lezhë County, northwestern Albania. At the 2015 local government reform it became a subdivision of the municipality Lezhë. The population at the 2023 census was 3,817.
