= Lezhë County =

County in northern Albania

Lezhë County Qarku i Lezhës (Albanian)
- County
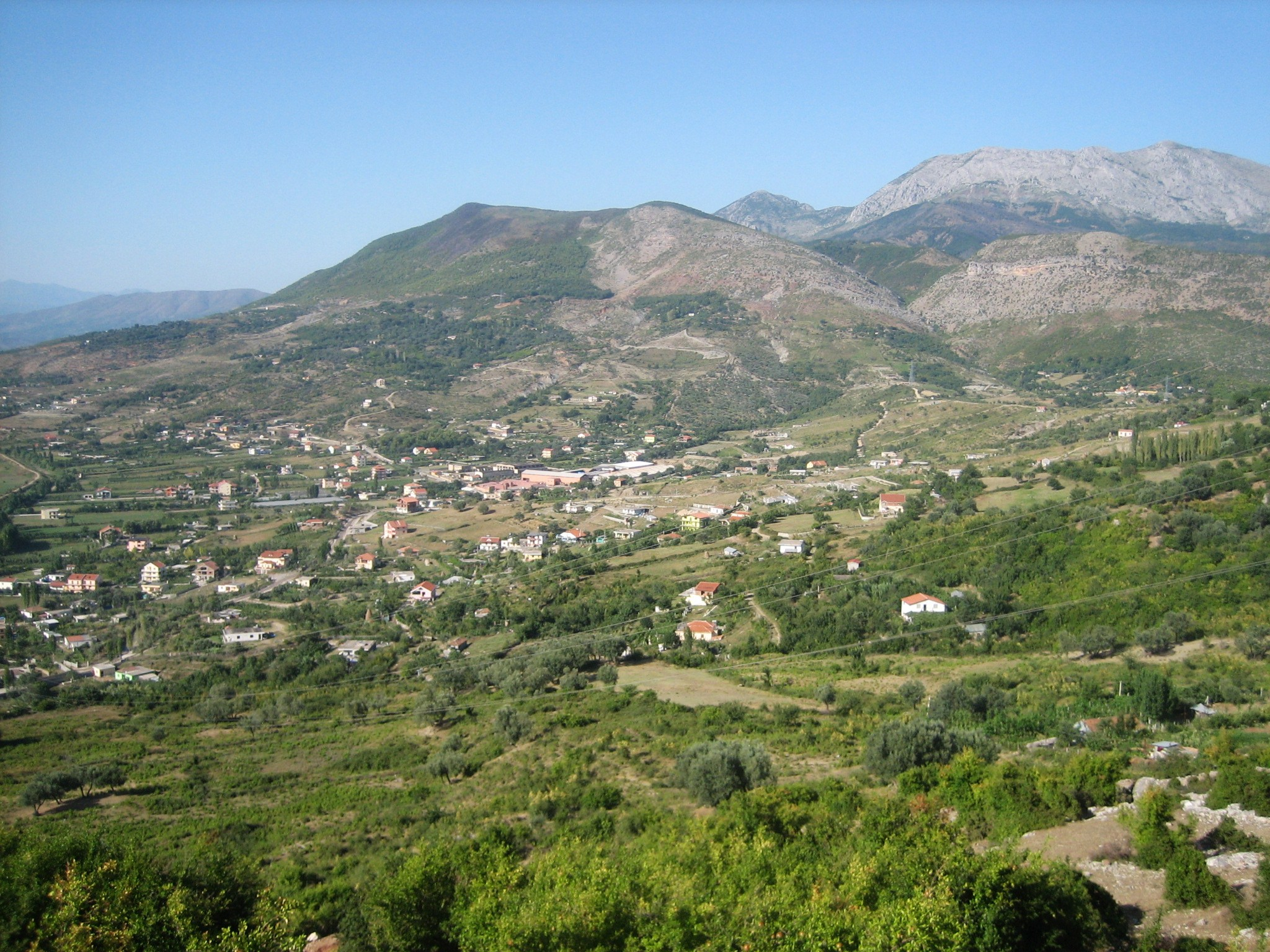
- View from Lezhë Castle

- Flag Emblem

- Coordinates: 41°45′N 19°50′E
- Country: Albania
- Seat: Lezhë
- Subdivisions: 3 municipalities, 175 towns and villages

Government
  - Council chairman: Eduart Ndreca (PS)

Area
  - Total: 1,620 km^{2} (630 sq mi)

Population (2023)
  - Total: 99,384
  - Density: 61.3/km^{2} (159/sq mi)
- Time zone: UTC+1 (CET)
  - Summer (DST): UTC+2 (CEST)
- HDI (2023): 0.806 very high · 9th of 12
- NUTS Code: AL014
- Website: Official Website

Lezhë County (Albanian: Qarku i Lezhës) is one of the 12 counties of Albania. The population as of 2021 was 120,678, in an area of 1,620 km². Its capital is the city Lezhë.

== Administrative divisions ==
Until 2000, Lezhë County was subdivided into three districts: Kurbin, Lezhë, and Mirditë. Since the 2015 local government reform, the county consists of the following 3 municipalities: Kurbin, Lezhë and Mirditë. Before 2015, it consisted of the following 21 municipalities:

- Balldren i Ri
- Blinisht
- Dajç
- Fan
- Fushë-Kuqë
- Kaçinar
- Kallmet
- Kolsh
- Kthellë
- Laç
- Lezhë
- Mamurras
- Milot
- Orosh
- Rrëshen
- Rubik
- Selitë
- Shëngjin
- Shënkoll
- Ungrej
- Zejmen

The municipalities consist of about 175 towns and villages in total. See Villages of Lezhë County for a structured list.

== Demographics ==
Historical population
Year	Pop.	±%
1950	45,533	—
1960	63,373	+39.2%
1979	113,621	+79.3%
1989	165,254	+45.4%
2001	159,182	−3.7%
2011	134,027	−15.8%
2023	99,384	−25.8%

As of the 2023 census, this county has 99,384 inhabitants. Ethnic groups in the county as of the 2011 census include:

- Albanians = 116,469 (86.90%)
- Greeks = 41 (0.03%)
- Macedonians = 9 (0.01%)
- Montenegrins = 8 (0.01%)
- Aromanians = 15 (0.01%)
- Romani = 187 (0.14%)
- Egyptians = 240 (0.18%)
- others = 18 (0.01%)
- no answer = 17,040 (12.71%)
- total = 134,027

=== Religion ===
Between the 2011 and 2023 censuses in Lezhë, the religious landscape showed some shifts. The Sunni Muslim population increased its share from 14.8% to 17.5%, and Bektashi Muslims also saw a rise from 0.3% to 0.6%. The Catholic Christian population, which remained the dominant group, increased from 72.3% to 74.4%. Orthodox Christians rose from 0.1% to 0.4%. Evangelical Christians increased from 0.0% to 0.2%.

There was a notable increase in the irreligious population: atheists rose from 0.1% to 0.5%, and those identifying as believers without denomination grew from 1.1% to 1.9%. Meanwhile, the "Prefer not to answer" category saw a significant decrease, dropping from 8.0% to 2.6%, and the "Not stated/other" category also decreased from 3.1% to 1.9%.

Population of Lezhë according to religious group (2011–2023)
Religion group	Census 2011		Census 2023		Difference (2023−2011)	
Religion group	Number	Percentage	Number	Percentage	Number	Percentage
Sunni Muslim	19,845	14.8%	17,416	17.5%	-2,429	+2.7%
Bektashi Muslim	333	0.3%	576	0.6%	+243	+0.3%
Total Muslim	20,178	15.1%	17,992	18.1%	-2,186	+3.0%
Catholic Christian	97,014	72.3%	73,938	74.4%	-13,076	+2.1%
Orthodox Christian	85	0.1%	385	0.4%	+300	+0.3%
Evangelical	17	0.0%	214	0.2%	+197	+0.2%
Other Christian	9	0.0%	33	0.0%	+24	+0.0%
Total Christian*	97,125	72.5%	74,570	74.9%	-2,555	+2.4%
Atheists	175	0.1%	470	0.5%	+295	+0.4%
Believers without denomination	1,459	1.1%	1,856	1.9%	+397	+0.8%
Total Non-religious	1,634	1.2%	2,326	2.3%	+692	+1.1%
Prefer not to answer	10,724	8.0%	2,577	2.6%	-8,147	-5.4%
Not stated / Not available**	4,189	3.1%	1,919	1.9%	-2,270	-1.2%
TOTAL	134,027	100%	99,384	100%	-34,643	–
