= Lezhë =

City in Albania

Lezhë Lezha
- Municipality
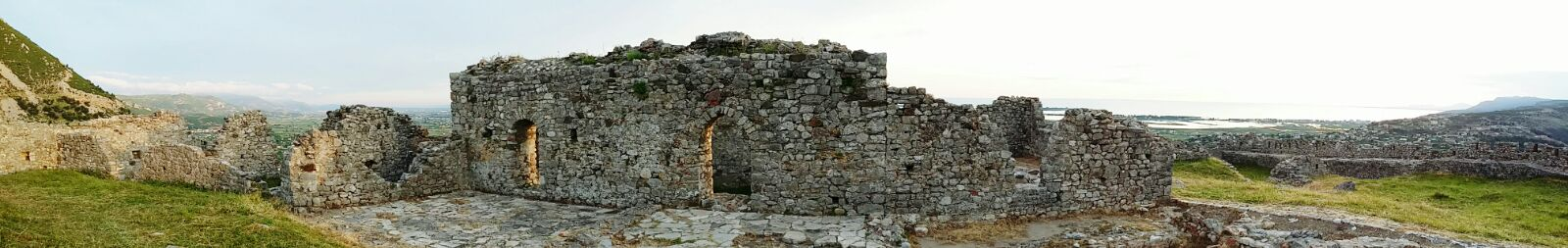
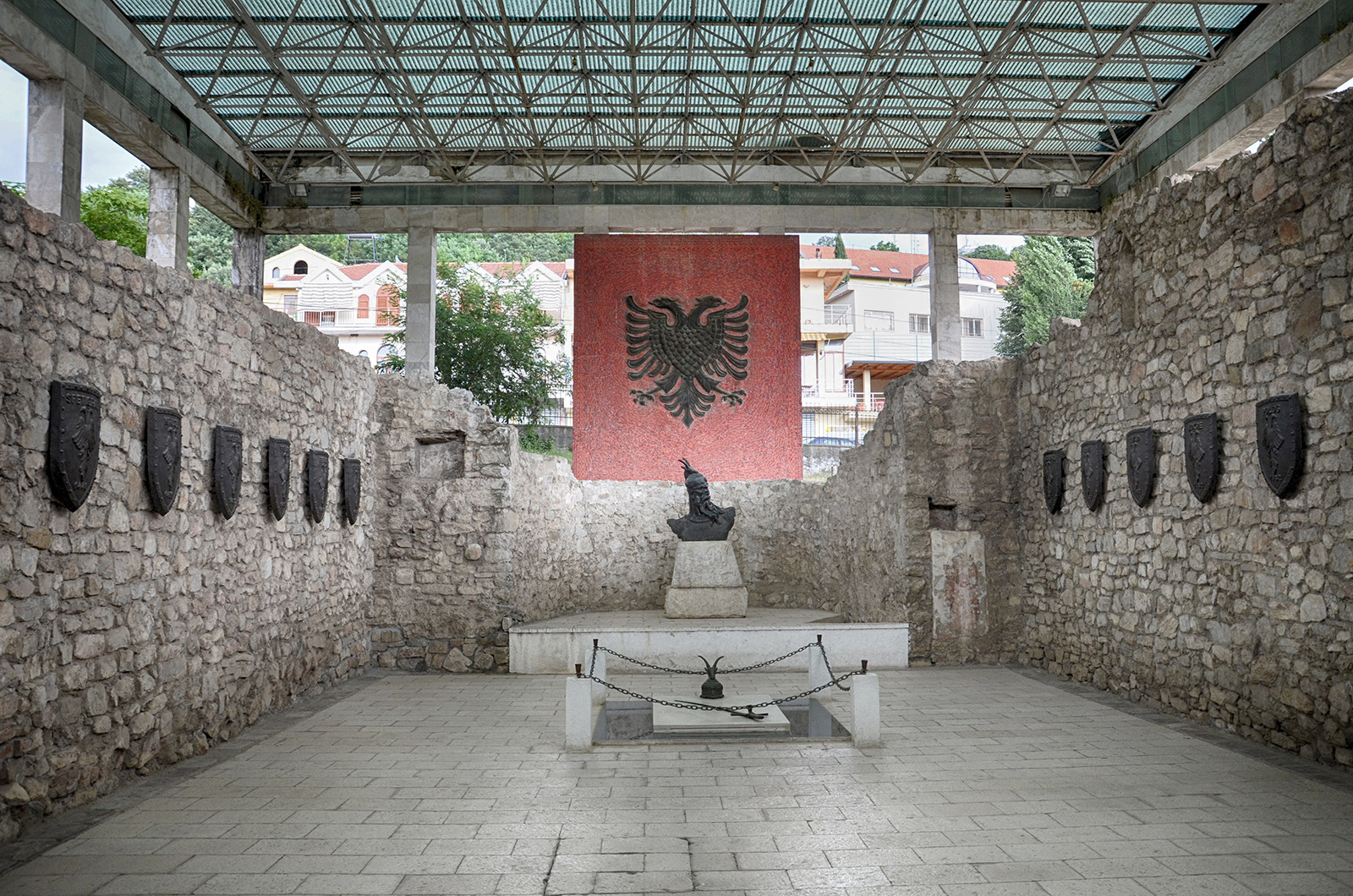
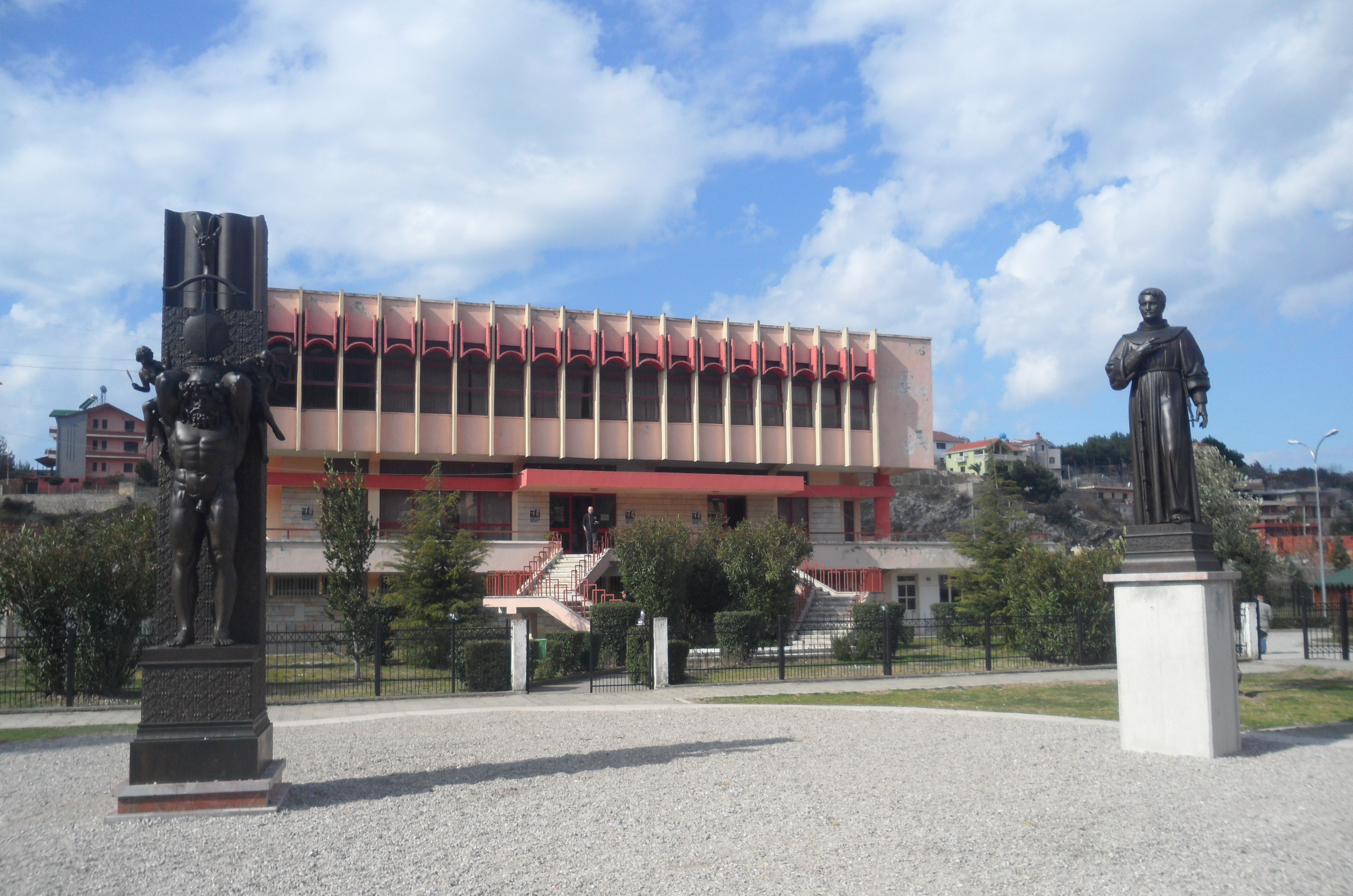
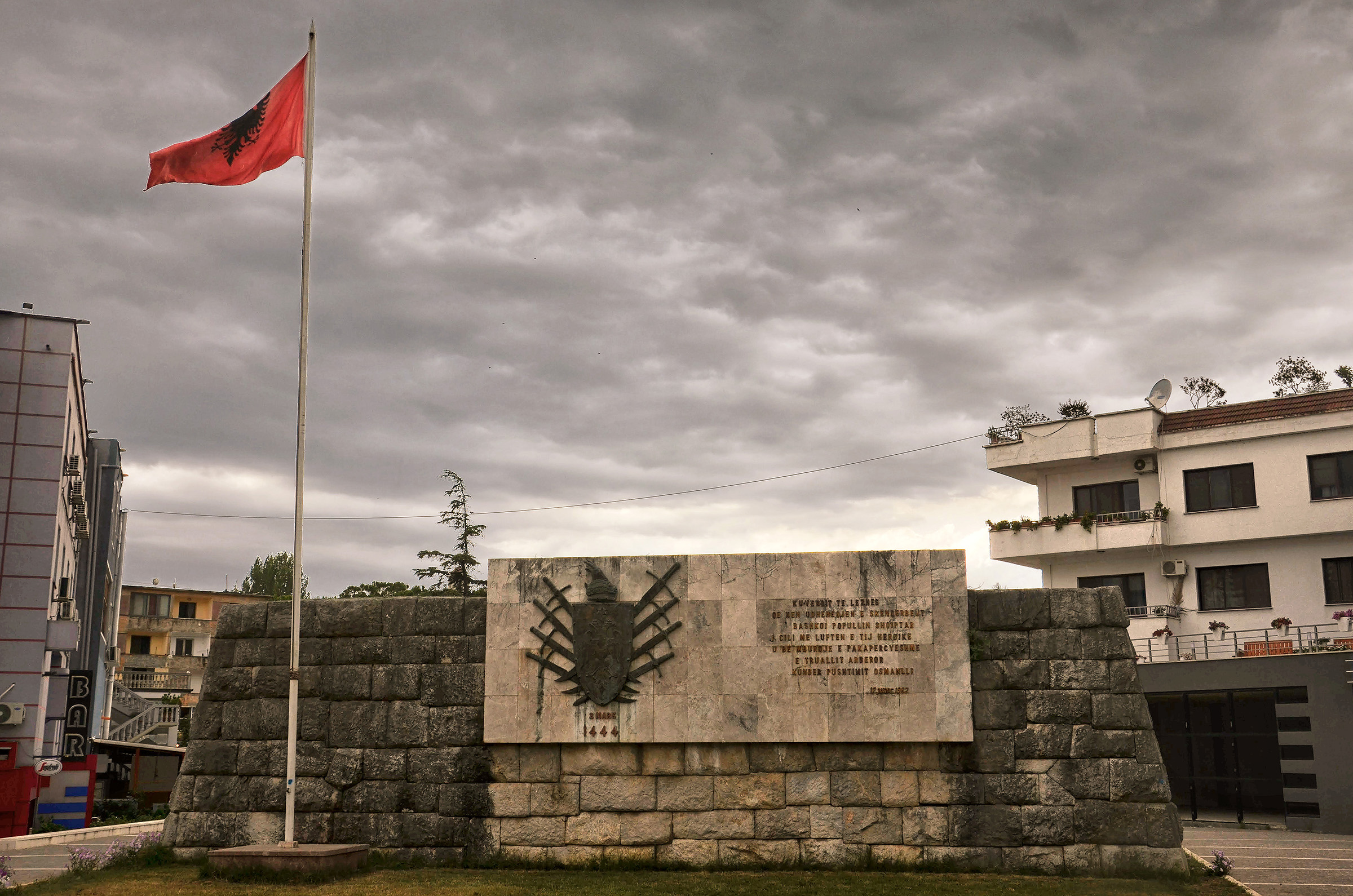
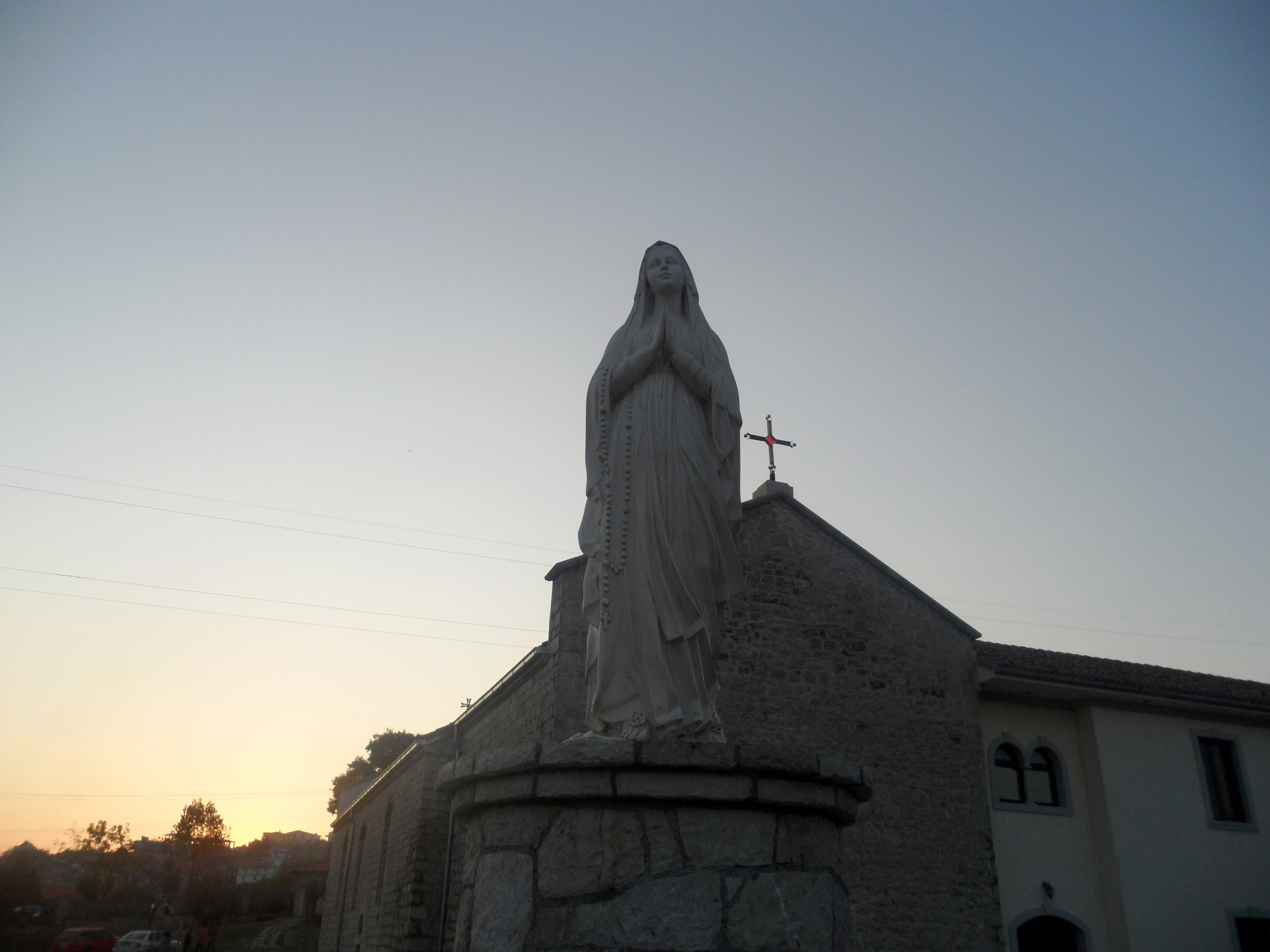
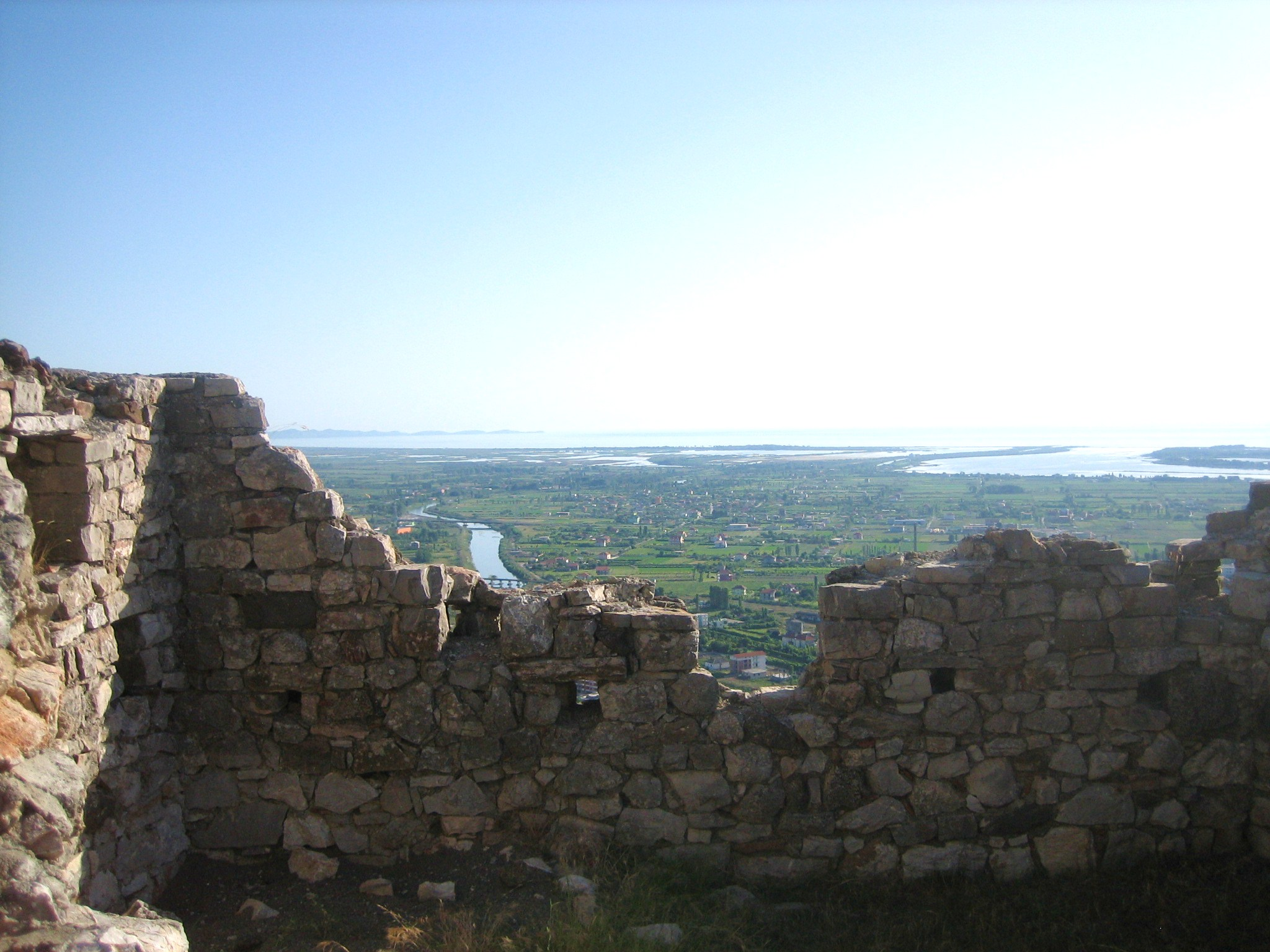
- Photomontage of Lezhë

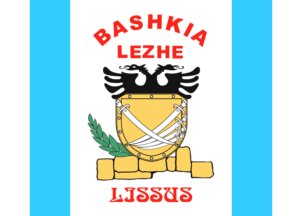
- Flag Emblem

- Location within Albania
- Coordinates: 41°46′55″N 19°38′40″E
- Country: Albania
- County: Lezhë
- Settled: 4th century BC

Government
  - Mayor: Pjerin Ndreu (PS)

Area
  - Municipality: 506.4 km^{2} (195.5 sq mi)
  - Administrative unit: 2.58 km^{2} (1.00 sq mi)
- Elevation: 10 m (33 ft)

Population (2023)
  - Municipality: 51,354
  - Municipality density: 101.4/km^{2} (262.7/sq mi)
  - Administrative unit: 14,687
  - Administrative unit density: 5,690/km^{2} (14,700/sq mi)
- Demonym(s): Albanian: Lezhjan (m), Lezhjane (f)
- Time zone: UTC+1 (CET)
  - Summer (DST): UTC+2 (CEST)
- Postal Code: 4500
- Area Code: (0)215
- Website: lezha.gov.al

Lezhë (Albanian: [ˈlɛʒə], Albanian definite form: Lezha) is a city in the Republic of Albania and seat of Lezhë County and Lezhë Municipality. It is one of Albania's oldest continuously inhabited cities, with roughly 2,400 years of recorded history.

One of the main strongholds of the Labeatai, the earliest of the fortification walls of Lezhë are of typical Illyrian construction and are dated to the late 4th century BC. Lezhë was one of the main centres of the Illyrian kingdom. During the conflicts with Macedon, it was captured by Philip V becoming the Macedonian outlet to the Adriatic Sea. The city was later recovered by the Illyrians. It was subjected to Rome after the Roman-Illyrian wars and the fall of Gentius' realm. Lezhë was the site of the League of Lezhë where Skanderbeg united the Albanian lords in the fight against the Ottoman Empire.

== Name ==
The city is mentioned in ancient sources as Lissós (Ancient Greek: Λισσός) and Lissus (Latin: Lissus, Lissum). It is also attested in numismatic material. The ethnicon ΛΙΣΣΙΤΑΝ Lissitan is found on coin inscriptions of the Hellenistic era. It is considered a Greek toponym, deriving from the Greek λισσός lissós, meaning 'smooth, smooth rock, gruff'.

According to Stephanus of Byzantium, the city was known not only as Lissos but also as Akrolissos (Ἀκρόλισσος), whereas Strabo considered Lissos and Akrolissos to be distinct locations, identifying Akrolissos as a fortress near Lissos.

The Greek name Lissós evolved into its modern form Lezhë (archaic: Lesh) through Albanian sound changes. In Turkish, the town is known as Leş or Eşim and in Italian as Alessio. Lezhë is also known as Alise, Alexiensis, Eschenderari, or Mrtav.

== History ==
=== Early history ===
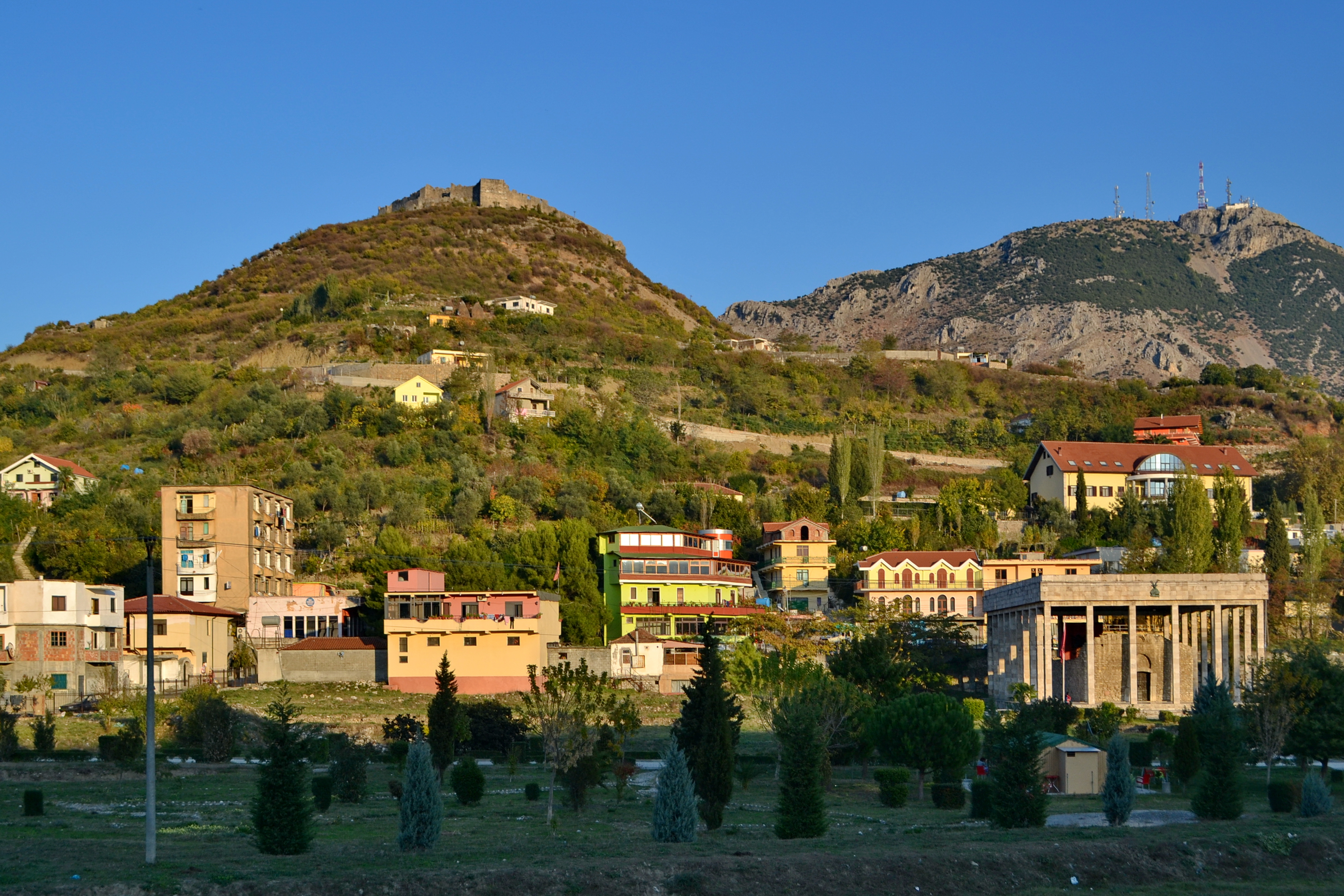
The Iron Age fortification was built on the Mal i Shëlbuemit (413 m high, right), called later Acrolissus; the proper city of Lissus was built on an adjacent hill (172 m high, left).

Various swords (C and D type) unearthed in Lezhë are attributed to a free exchange pattern between the locals and the centres of Mycenaean Greece from the early Mycenaean period (1600-1450 BC). The earliest human constructions have an Illyrian character and appear on the site from the Late Bronze Age and Early Iron Age. The settlement with its fortifications was built on a 413-metre-high mountain, the Mal i Shëlbuemit, from at least the 8th century BC, and was located near the mouth of the Drin river.

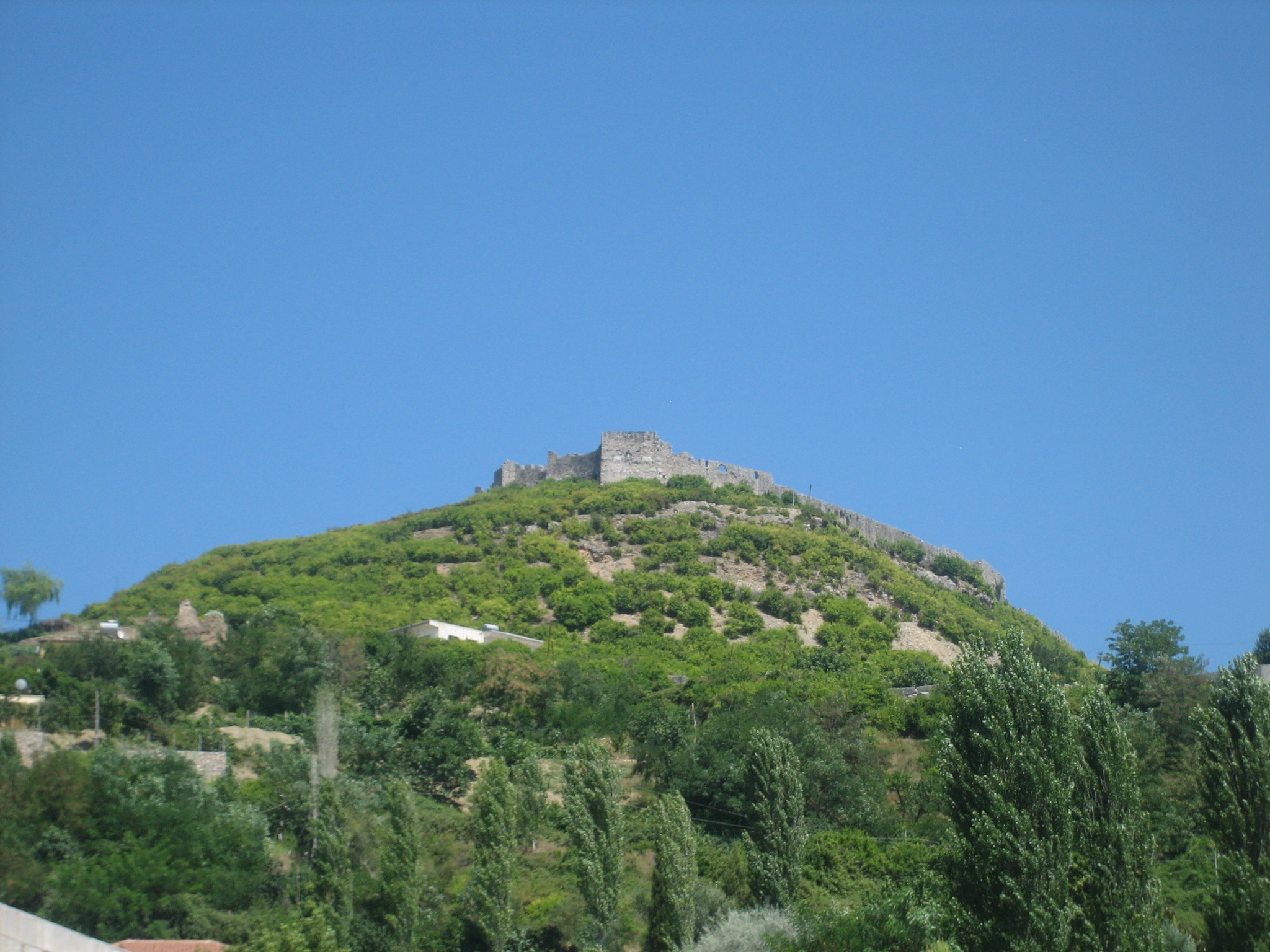
Lezhë Castle on the 172 m hill.

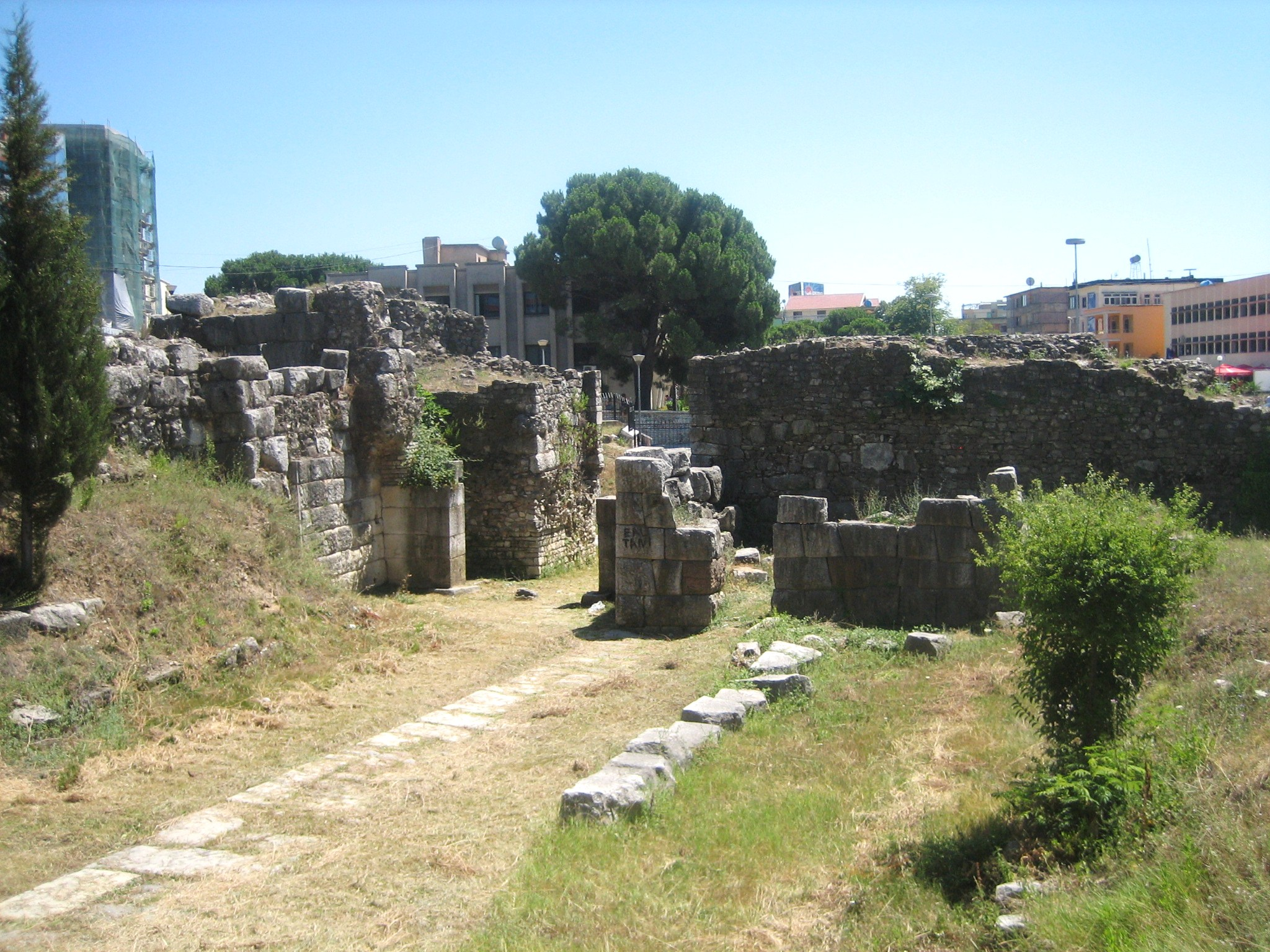
Ruins of Hellenistic fortification walls built during the Illyrian urban period.

In antiquity the area was described as the territory of the Illyrii tribe (the "Illyrians proper"; Ancient Greek: Ἰλλυριοί, Illyrioi; Latin: Illyrii or Illyrii propriae dicti; Albanian: ilirët).

Diodorus ("Library", 15.1, c. 1st century BC) mentions that Dionysius of Syracuse founded a "city called Lissos" in the year 385 BC, as part of a strategy by Dionysius to secure Syracusan trade routes along the Adriatic. Diodorus calls it a polis. Some modern scholars have interpreted that the Syracusan colony mentioned by Diodorus was established on the site of Lezhë, but more recently scholars think that it was in fact more likely established at Issa near the island of Pharos, not at Lissus (modern Lezhë) which was too distant for the events described by the ancient historian. Meanwhile, Issa is known from other evidence to be a Syracusan foundation. Except Diodorus' account there is nothing to connect Lissos (the ancient site of Lezhë) with Syracuse, and according to historian Pierre Cabanes, even if Diodorus' account is accepted as accurate, it is very likely that this colony had a short life.

The earliest of the fortification walls of the proto-urban settlement are of typical Illyrian construction and are dated to the late 4th century BC. The transition from the Iron Age fortification of Acrolissus (on the 413 m Shëlbuem mountain) to the proper Illyrian city of Lissus was continuous. The city was built on a lower hill (172 m) near the Iron Age fortification. It was surrounded by ramparts that faced the low valley of the Drin river and the sea coast. Its function was to guard the route inland, to ensure defense against possible attacks from the sea, and to furnish a secure anchorage for the Illyrian ships.

By the 3rd century BC, Lissus was one of the main cities of the Illyrian kingdom under the Ardiaean and Labeatan dynasties. In the 228 BC peace treaty with Rome, the Illyrian queen Teuta promised not to sail south of Lissus at the mouth of the Drin river with more than two lembi (Illyrian light ships), even those had to be unarmed. But when Rome was engaged in a war against the Celtic peoples of the Po Valley in northern Italy about the years 225–222 BC, Illyrian commander Demetrius detached the Atintani tribe from their alliance with Rome. Moreover, he sailed south of Lissus and engaged in piracy in violation of the 228 BC peace treaty. In the summer of 221 BC, tensions in Greece increased as Macedonia allied with the Achaean League against the Aetolian League, and the Illyrians attacked in their typical manner. Demetrius and Scerdilaidas sailed with 90 lembi south of Lissus. When they failed an assault on Pylos (western Peloponnese), they separated their fleets and Scerdilaidas returned north with 40 ships, while Demetrius plundered the Cyclades with 50 ships.

In Roman times Lissus was located in a territory inhabited by the Labeatae, however ancient sources never relate it with this tribe. Taking in account archaeological and historical considerations, the city of Lissus should have been founded in a Labeatan context, but perhaps by the time of Teuta's fall in the end of the 3rd century BC, on a Greek model it was organized as a polis turning away from its ethnic context. The dissociation from the ethnic to the polis coincided with Philip V of Macedon's conquest of a number of cities in Illyria. In 211 BC, Philip V captured Acrolissus, the citadel of Lissus, and Lissos surrendered to him, becoming the Macedonian outlet to the Adriatic Sea. The town was later recovered by the Illyrians. It was in Lissus that Perseus of Macedon negotiated an alliance against Rome with the Illyrian king Gentius, and it was from Lissus that Gentius organized his army against the Romans. Lissus maintained a large degree of municipal autonomy under both Macedonian and Illyrian rule, as evidenced by the coins minted there. During the reign of Gentius in the first half of the 2nd century BC, Lissus minted coins for the Illyrian ruler. The city was of some importance in the Roman Civil War, being taken by Marc Antony and then remaining loyal to Caesar. In Roman times, the city was part of the province of Epirus Nova,

=== Middle Ages ===
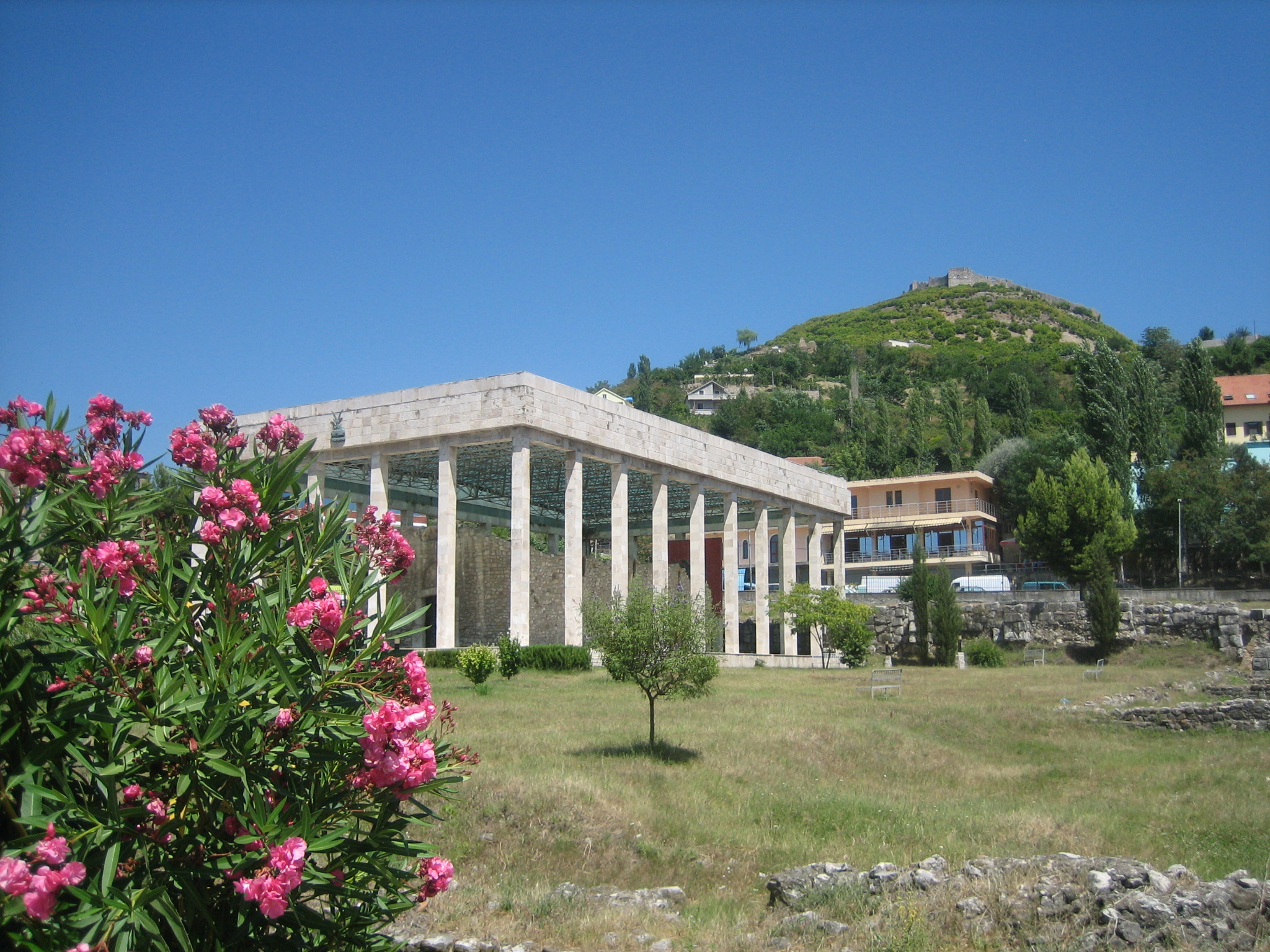
The grave of Skanderbeg and Lezhë Castle on its hill. The structure was the former Selimie Mosque.

During the reign of Justinian I (527-565) the local fortress was possibly mentioned as Alistion in the Synecdemus of Hierocles. At early 590s Lissus was captured by Slavic populations. Byzantine control was re-established during the early 9th century.

Albanian lord Vladislav Jonima of the Jonima family was acknowledged by the Pope as a ruler of a territory around Lezhë in 1319. He had the title of Count of Dioclea and of the seaside Albania. At the end of the 14th century, Albanian lord Dhimitër Jonima was lord of a territory between Mat and Lezhë.

In the Middle Ages, Lezha (known in Italian as Alessio) frequently changed masters until the Venetians took possession of it in 1386. It still belonged to them when Skanderbeg died, but In 1478 it fell into the hands of Turks during the siege of Shkodra, except for a short period (1501–1506) when it returned to Venetian domination. Because it was under the Venetian control, it was chosen in 1444 by Gjergj Kastrioti Skanderbeg as a neutral place for the convention of Albanian nobles and lords of the area aiming at organizing their common defence against the Turks.

Lezha was the site of the League of Lezhë where Skanderbeg united the Albanian princes in the fight against the Ottoman Empire.

Skanderbeg was buried in the cathedral of Lezhë which was dedicated to Saint Nicholas and later used as Selimie Mosque.

=== Contemporary ===
Today Lezhë is a growing city. Its proximity to the port of Shëngjin as well as its location on the national road between the Montenegrin border to the North and Tirana to the South makes it an attractive location for industry and business.

== Geography ==
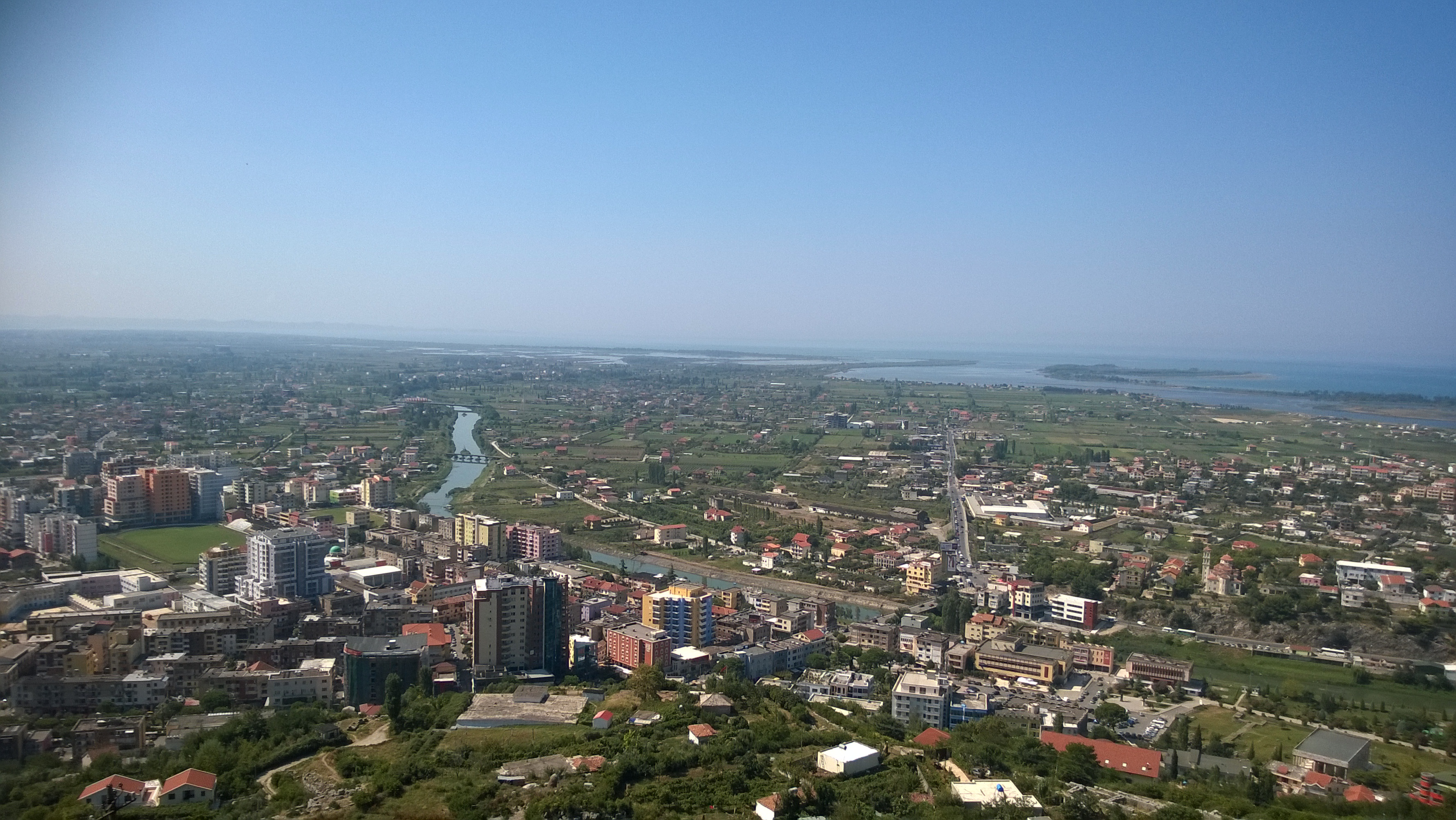
View over Lezhë and the Albanian Adriatic Sea Coast in the distance.

Lezhë Municipality lies within Lezhë County as part of the Northern Region of Albania and consists of the adjacent administrative units of Balldren, Blinisht, Dajç, Kallmet, Kolsh, Shëngjin, Shënkoll, Ungrej, Zejmen with Lezhë constituting the municipal seat. The municipality spans between the Plain of Zadrima in the north, the Pukë-Mirditë Highlands in the east, the mouth of the Mat River in the south and the Albanian Adriatic Sea Coast in the west. It covers 509.1 km^{2}.

=== Climate ===
As of the Köppen climate classification, Lezhë falls under the periphery of the hot-summer Mediterranean climate (Csa) zone with an average annual temperature of 14.6 °C (58.3 °F).

Climate data for Lezhë
Month	Jan	Feb	Mar	Apr	May	Jun	Jul	Aug	Sep	Oct	Nov	Dec	Year
Mean daily maximum °C (°F)	10.1 (50.2)	11.7 (53.1)	15.0 (59.0)	18.9 (66.0)	23.9 (75.0)	27.6 (81.7)	31.0 (87.8)	30.9 (87.6)	27.2 (81.0)	21.6 (70.9)	16.1 (61.0)	11.7 (53.1)	20.5 (68.9)
Mean daily minimum °C (°F)	1.8 (35.2)	3.0 (37.4)	5.2 (41.4)	8.8 (47.8)	13.0 (55.4)	14.7 (58.5)	18.5 (65.3)	18.2 (64.8)	15.2 (59.4)	10.9 (51.6)	7.0 (44.6)	4.2 (39.6)	10.0 (50.1)
Average precipitation mm (inches)	165 (6.5)	143 (5.6)	129 (5.1)	118 (4.6)	87 (3.4)	60 (2.4)	36 (1.4)	52 (2.0)	104 (4.1)	136 (5.4)	191 (7.5)	179 (7.0)	1,400 (55)
Average rainy days	13	12	13	13	10	8	5	6	8	10	14	13	125
Average relative humidity (%)	74	71	69	69	68	64	59	61	68	71	75	75	69
Mean monthly sunshine hours	130.2	130	173.6	201	269.7	306	362.7	322.4	258	207.7	138	117.8	2,617.1
Mean daily sunshine hours	4.2	4.6	5.6	6.7	8.7	10.2	11.7	10.4	8.6	6.7	4.6	3.8	7.2
Source: Weather2visit

== Demographics ==
Historical population
Year	Pop.	±%
1950	1,084	—
1960	2,458	+126.8%
1969	4,100	+66.8%
1979	6,900	+68.3%
1989	10,348	+50.0%
2001	14,420	+39.4%
2011	15,510	+7.6%
2023	14,687	−5.3%

The population of the municipality of Lezhë as of the 2023 census is 51,354, (Note: The population of the municipality results from the sum of the administrative units in the former as of the 2023 Albanian census.) of which 14,687 in the city proper.

== Culture ==
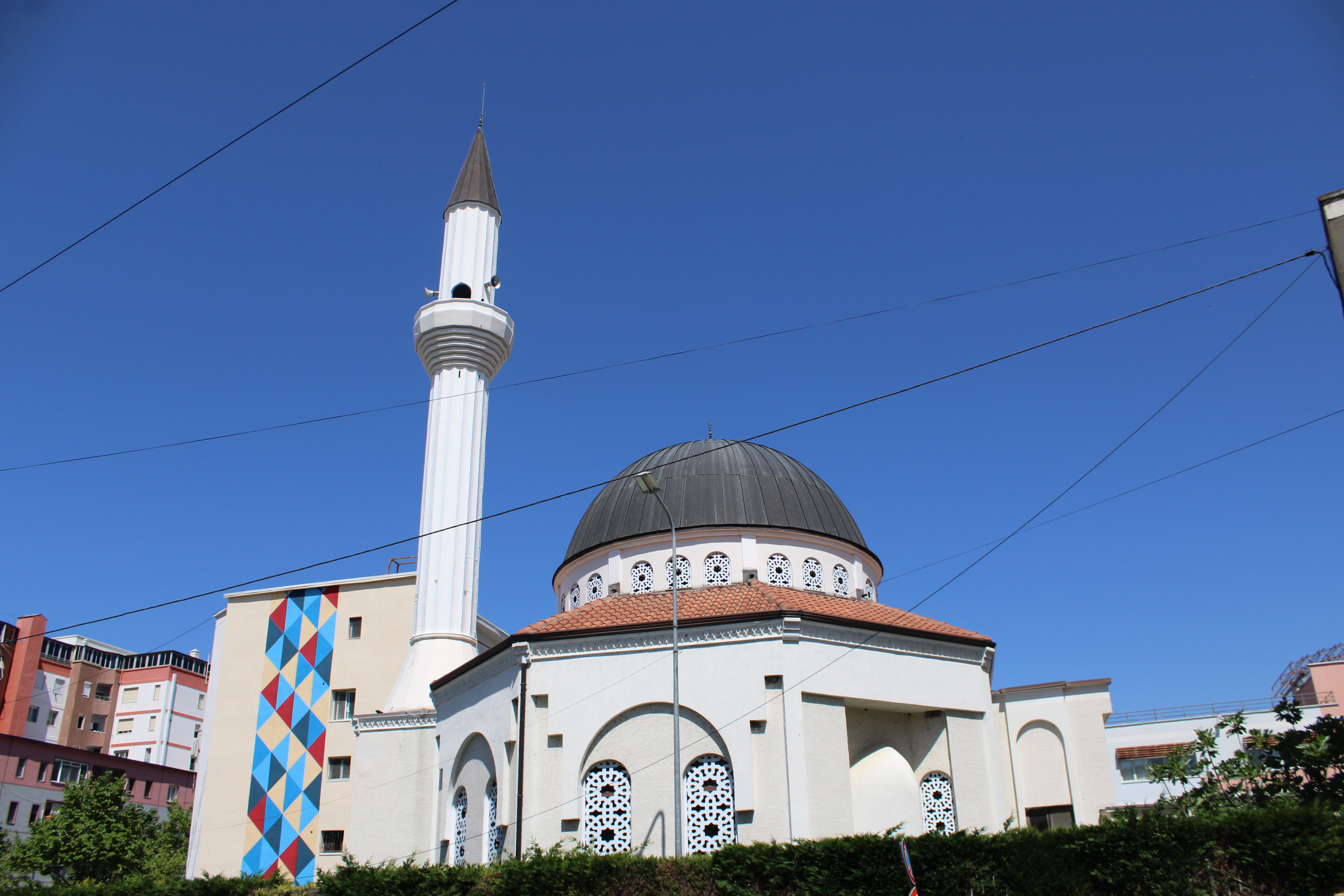
The mosque of Lezhe

The association football club is KS Besëlidhja Lezhë. Although primarily concerned with football and basketball, KS Besëlidhja also participates in sports such as wrestling and beach volleyball.

From 2004 an excavation started around the ancient Acropolis of Lissos and the Skanderbeg Memorial, which revealed Hellenistic, Roman and Early Byzantine buildings, tombs and other findings.

== Notable people ==
- Antonio Bruti, 16th century merchant and diplomat
- Anton Kryezezi, Bishop of Lezhë
- Lekë Dukagjini, prince
- Jonima (Gjoni) family noble family
- Gjergj Fishta, Catholic priest and poet
- Ndoc Gjetja, poet
- Henri Ndreka, football player, capped with Albania
- Robert Grizha, football player
- Erjon Dushku, football player
- Renato Malota, football player
- Ornel Gega, rugby union player
- Tosol Bardhi, 16th century Albanian Catholic Priest.
- Florjan Përgjoni, Albanian football player, born in Lezhë who currently plays for KF Tirana.
- Indrit Tuci, Albanian footballer born in Lezhë, currently plays for Sparta Prague.

== See also ==
- List of settlements in Illyria
- List of mayors of Lezhë

== Bibliography ==
- Beekes, Robert S. P. (2009). Beek, Lucien van (ed.). Etymological Dictionary of Greek. Brill. ISBN 978-90-04-32186-1.
- Boardman, John; Sollberger, E. (1982). J. Boardman; I. E. S. Edwards; N. G. L. Hammond; E. Sollberger (eds.). The Cambridge Ancient History: The Prehistory of the Balkans; and the Middle East and the Aegean world, tenth to eighth centuries B.C. Vol. III (part 1) (2 ed.). Cambridge University Press. ISBN 0521224969.
- Errington, R. M. (1989). "Rome and Greece to 250 B.C.". In A. E. Astin; F. W. Walbank; M. W. Frederiksen; R. M. Ogilvie (eds.). The Cambridge Ancient History: Rome and the Mediterranean to 133 B.C. Vol. VIII (2 ed.). Cambridge University Press. pp. 81–106. ISBN 0-521-23448-4.
- Eckstein, Arthur M. (2008). Rome Enters the Greek East: From Anarchy to Hierarchy in the Hellenistic Mediterranean, 230-170 B.C. Malden, MA.; Oxford: Blackwell Publishing.
- Elsie, Robert (2010). Historical Dictionary of Albania (PDF). Historical Dictionaries of Europe. Vol. 75 (2 ed.). Scarecrow Press. p. 255. ISBN 978-0810861886. Archived from the original (PDF) on 6 October 2014.
- Gaffiot, Félix (1934). Dictionnaire Illustré Latin-Français. Hachette.
- Hammond, Nicholas Geoffrey Lemprière (1966). "The Kingdoms in Illyria circa 400-167 B.C.". The Annual of the British School at Athens. 61. British School at Athens: 239–253. doi:10.1017/S0068245400019043. JSTOR 30103175. S2CID 164155370.
- Katičić, Radoslav (1976). Ancient Languages of the Balkans. Mouton. ISBN 978-9027933058.
- Lippert, Andreas; Matzinger, Joachim (2021). Die Illyrer: Geschichte, Archäologie und Sprache. Kohlhammer Verlag. ISBN 9783170377103.
- Matijašić, Ivan (2011). ""Shrieking like Illyrians": Historical geography and the Greek perspective of the Illyrian world in the 5th century BC". Arheološki Vestnik. 62: 289–316.
- Papadopoulos, John (2016). "Komai, Colonies and Cities in Epirus and Southern Albania: The Failure of the Polis and the Rise of Urbanism on the Fringes of the Greek World". In Molloy, Barry P.C. (ed.). Of Odysseys and Oddities: Scales and Modes of Interaction Between Prehistoric Aegean Societies and their Neighbours. Oxbow Books. pp. 435–460. ISBN 978-1-78570-232-7.
- Sedlar, Jean W. (2013). East Central Europe in the Middle Ages, 1000-1500. University of Washington Press. ISBN 9780295800646.
- Shehi, Eduard (2015). Terra sigillata en Illyrie méridionale et en Chaonie: importations et productions locales (IIe S. AV. J.-C. -IIe S. AP. J.-C.). Col·lecció Instrumenta (in French). Vol. 48. Barcelona: Universitat de Barcelona, Publicacions i Edicions. ISBN 978-84-475-4238-3.
- Shpuza, Saimir (2014). Dyczek, Piotr (ed.). "Iron Age Fortifications and the Origin of the City in the Territory of Scodra". Novensia. 25. Warszawa: Ośrodek Badań nad Antykiem Europy Południowo-Wschodniej: 105–126. ISBN 978-83-934239-96. ISSN 0860-5777.
- Shpuza, Saimir; Dyczek, Piotr (2015). "Scodra, de la capitale du Royaume Illyrien à la capitale de la province romaine". In Jean-Luc Lamboley; Luan Përzhita; Altin Skenderaj (eds.). L'Illyrie Méridionale et l'Épire dans l'Antiquité – VI (in French). Vol. 1. Paris: Diffusion De Boccard. pp. 269–278. ISBN 978-9928-4517-1-2.
- Shpuza, Saimir (2017). Dyczek, Piotr (ed.). "Scodra and the Labeates. Cities, rural fortifications and territorial defense in the Hellenistic period". Novensia. 28. Warszawa: Ośrodek Badań nad Antykiem Europy Południowo-Wschodniej: 41–64. ISBN 978-83-946222-5-1. ISSN 0860-5777.
- Stylianou, P. J. (1998). A Historical Commentary on Diodorus Siculus, book 15. Clarendon Press. ISBN 0-19-815239-6.
- Cabanes, Pierre (2008). "Greek Colonisation in the Adriatic". In Tsetskhladze, Gocha R. (ed.). Greek Colonisation: An Account of Greek Colonies and Other Settlements Overseas. Vol. 2. Brill. pp. 155–186. ISBN 9789047442448.
- Waterfield, Robin (2014). Taken at the Flood: The Roman Conquest of Greece. OUP Oxford. ISBN 978-0-19-166414-4.
- Wilkes, John J. (1992). The Illyrians. Oxford, United Kingdom: Blackwell Publishing. ISBN 0-631-19807-5.
- Wilkes, J. J.; Fischer-Hansen, Tobias (2004). "The Adriatic". In Mogens Herman Hansen; Thomas Heine Nielsen (eds.). An Inventory of Archaic and Classical Poleis. Oxford University Press. pp. 321–337. ISBN 0-19-814099-1.
