= Gjon Markagjoni =

Albanian clan chieftain (1888–1966)

Kapidan Gjon Marka Gjoni
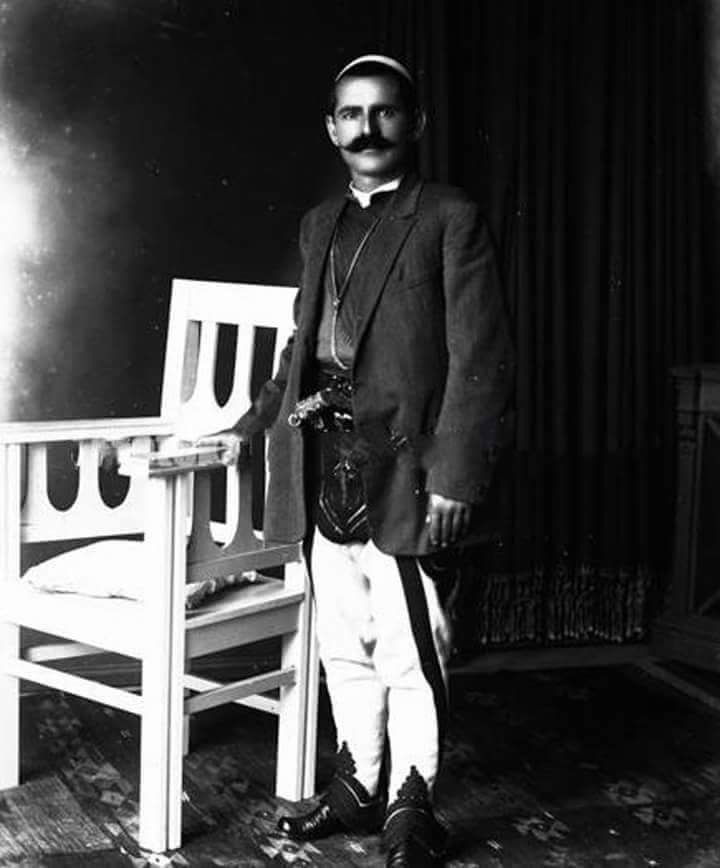
- Born: 28 August 1888; Orosh, Mirdita, Ottoman Empire (present-day Albania)
- Died: 28 April 1966 (aged 77); Rome, Italy
- Resting place: Rome, Italy
- Occupation: Kapidan of House Gjomarku
- Years active: 1925-1966
- Title: Kapidan of Mirdita
- Predecessor: Marka Gjoni
- Successor: Ndue Gjon Marku (Gjomarkaj)
- Spouse: Mrika
- Parent: Marka Gjoni

Gjon Marka Gjoni (28 August 1888 – 28 April 1966) was an Albanian Catholic clan chieftain (Albanian: Kapedan).

== Biography ==
He was born in Orosh, Mirdita, the only son of Kapidan Marka Gjoni (1861–1925). His father was the leader or Kapidan of Mirdita who rebelled against the Albanian government in favour of an independent Mirdita. In 1921 in an alliance with Esadists, Marka Gjoni founded the Republic of Mirdita in northern Albania and served as its president during its short existence. His republic did not receive recognition from other countries. Marka Gjoni's presidency was extinguished by the Albanian government the same year. Marka Gjoni fled to Yugoslavia, but later returned to Albania and remained active in the political life of the highlands.

Kapidan Gjon married Mrika Pervizi (1883-1969 the niece of the Bajraktar of Kurbin, Gjok Pjeter Pervizi. They had ten children.

=== Succession as clan leader, 1925 ===
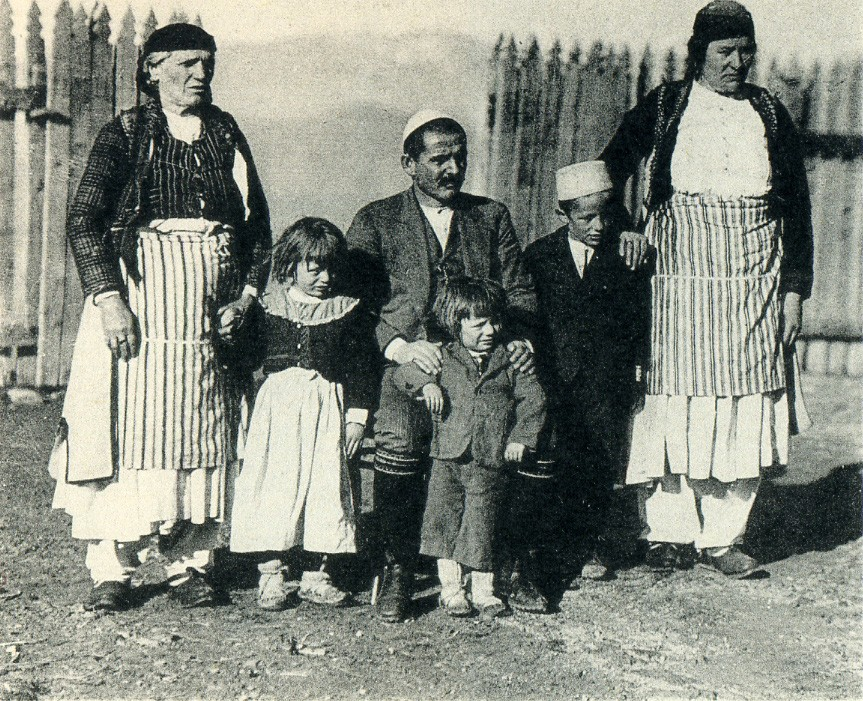
KapidanGjon with his mother Dava, wife Mrika, and children c.1929

After the death of his father, Kapidan Marka Gjoni in 1925, Kapidan Gjon inherited the responsibility handed down to him as leader of Mirdita. He was often called upon to intervene in feuds raging within other Mirdita tribes and to preside over the arguments with fairness and clarity, but most of all to pass on judgments following the guidelines of the Kanun. He unified Mirdita bjarak by bjrak by resolving 360 blood feuds in 1926 and an additional 260 in 1928. Because of his leadership skills in mediating reconciliation, he became widely known and many activists and foreign leaders requested to meet him.

The gathering on May 29, 1928, at the vice-prefecture of Shpal, Mirdita, to renew the Covenant of the Besa was one of the major events that occurred under the leadership of Kapidan Gjon Marka Gjoni. The commission of the five bajraks of Mirdita was assembled to address the equality of the bajraks and to bind them in accordance with the Kanun. On June 3 of that year, the commission was strengthened with a handshake between the twenty-five flagbearers of Mirdita. As a result of his ability to maintain calm and manage difficulties in Mirdita, the then president of Albania, Ahmet Zog, exempted Mirdita from state taxes.

When Ahmet Zogu was proclaimed king in 1928, he summoned all the northern mountain chiefs, including Kapidan Gjon, who was the first to meet with the king. Kapidan Gjon was promoted to the highest possible rank, Lieutenant Colonel.

In 1930 Kapidan Gjon went to Rome where he was received with high honors by the Italian Government and the Pope.

Upon the arrival of communism in Albania in 1944, Kapidan Gjon collaborated with his two eldest sons, Mark and Ndue, to organize the anti-communist resistance in the north.

=== Exile in Rome ===
With the advent of communism, he was forced to leave Albania under the escort of his second eldest son Ndue. In Kastrat, on November 26, 1944, he gave farewell to his son Mark who would stay behind and lead the resistance, along with his brother Llesh, both of whom died in combat; Mark on 14 June 1946 and Llesh on 9 August 1947.

In Rome, Kapidan Gjon Marka Gjoni, collaborated with the Albanian publicist and writer Ernest Koliqi, in sketching a political organization in exile. This organization was named "Independent National Bloc", which was formed on 6 November 1946.

Kapidan Gjon lived in Rome with his son Ndue, his daughter-in-law Maria Teresa, and three granddaughters: Maria Cristina, Bianca Maria and Alessandra. He became seriously ill in 1964. He recovered and remained in relatively good health until 1965, when his illness returned. This illness would keep him hospitalized for the next year until his death on April 28, 1966. He was buried in Rome on April 30, 1966 at the Verano cemetery. His funeral was attended by many dignitaries, scholars, and friends. Telegrams and condolences were sent by Leka, Crown Prince of Albania and Cardinal Antoniutti among others.

== See also ==
- Albanian Subversion
- Communism in Albania
- Republic of Mirdita
- Kryeziu Brothers
- Bardhok Biba
