= Mirdita =

Mirdita most commonly refers to:

- Mirdita (tribe), a tribe and historical region in northern Albania

It may also refer to:

- Mirditë, a municipality in Lezhë County, Albania
- Mirditë District, a former district in Albania
- Republic of Mirdita, a former unrecognized state
- Mirdita, Gostivar, a village in the municipality of Gostivar, North Macedonia
