= Prenk Bib Doda =

Albanian diplomat and prince

Prenk Bib Doda Pasha
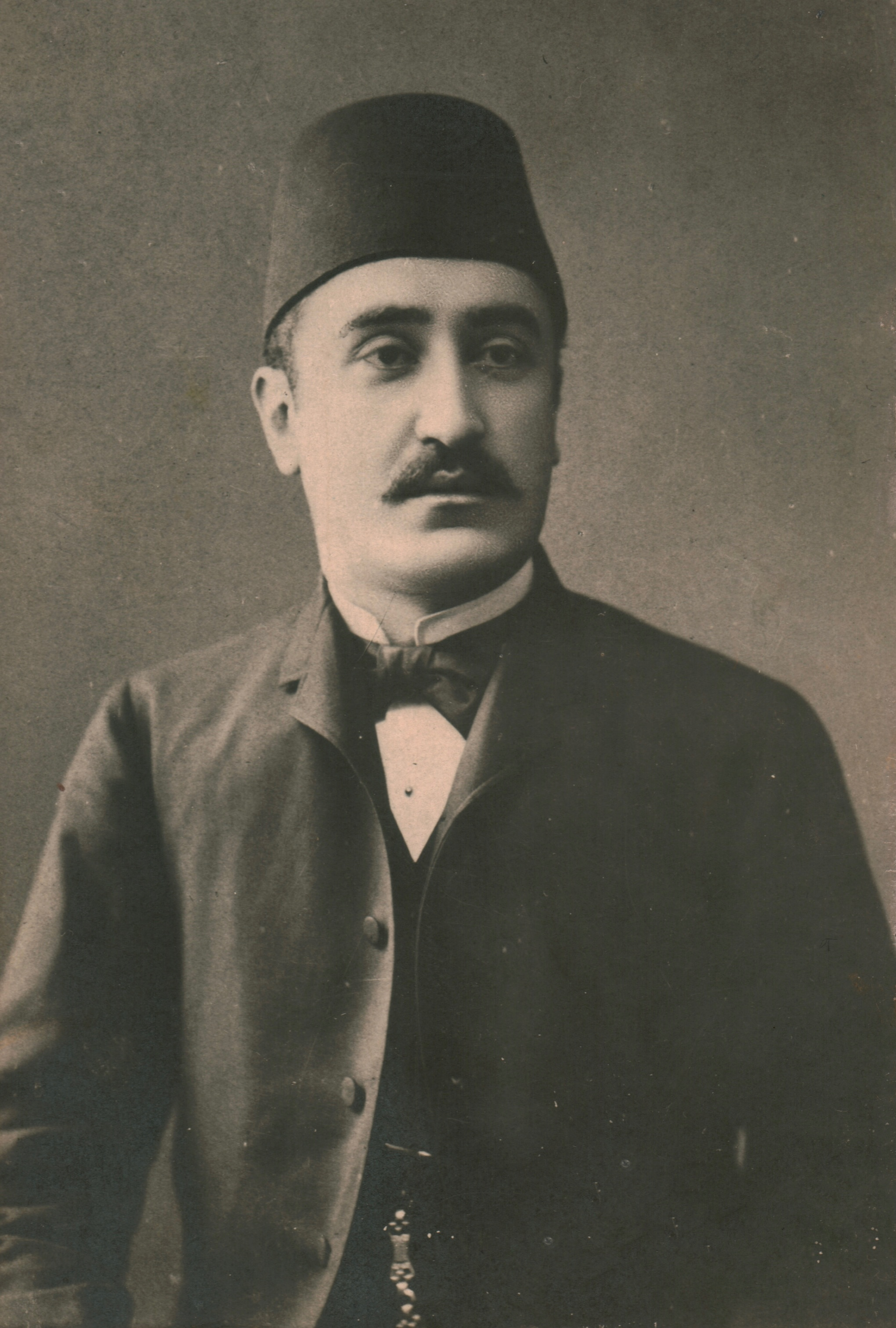

Kapedan of the Mirdita
- In office 1876 – 22 March 1919
- Preceded by: Bib Dod Pasha
- Succeeded by: Marka Gjoni

2nd Deputy Prime Minister of Albania
- In office 25 December 1913 – 22 January 1914
- Prime Minister: Ismail Qemali
- Preceded by: Nikoll Kaçorri
- Succeeded by: abbolished
- In office 25 December 1918 (Note: From 1914 until 1918 the post remained vacated due to the beginning of the First World War. On 25 December 1918 the Congress of Durrës was held appointing so called Government of Durrës, in which Doda was reappointed to the same position.) – 22 March 1919
- Monarch: Prince Wilhelm
- Prime Minister: Turhan Pasha Përmeti
- Succeeded by: Eshref Frashëri

3rd Minister of Foreign Affairs
- In office 28 May 1914 – 3 September 1914
- Monarch: Prince Wilhelm (Note: The monarch was in exile since 3 September 1914, but de jure remained as head of state until the constitution of the Albanian Republic)
- Prime Minister: Turhan Pasha Përmeti
- Preceded by: Turhan Pasha Përmeti
- Succeeded by: Pavli Terka

Personal details
- Born: 1860 Orosh, Mirditë, Ottoman Empire (today Albania)
- Died: 22 March 1919 (aged 58–59) Bregu i Matit, Lezhë, Principality of Albania
- Cause of death: Assassinated

Prenk Bib Doda, also known as Prênk Pasha (Albanian: Prenk Bibë Doda; 1860–1919), was an Albanian member of the Young Turks, prince of Mirdita, and politician in the Principality of Albania.

== Background ==
=== Early years ===
Doda was born in 1860 in Orosh, Mirditë District, the son of Bibë Dodë Pasha of the Gjonmarkaj clan. His mother was Hide Ajazi, the daughter of Hasan Ajazi. His father was given the title Pasha from the Ottomans due to his support in suppressing the Albanian Revolt of 1843–44 against the Tanzimat reforms. He spent his youth in Istanbul and returned to Mirdita in 1876. During the Great Eastern Crisis, Montenegro attempted to get Albanian tribes to revolt against the empire and Ottoman-Albanian officials of Shkodër attempted to counter those actions through negotiations with Doda. Doda later took two Ottoman negotiators hostage, closed access to roads passing through Mirdita and demanded the release of imprisoned Albanians in Shkodër's jail. French, British and Italian consuls attempted to mediate between the empire and Doda while the Ottoman governor moved troops into position. By mid-April Doda began his uprising against the Ottomans and the empire sent troops to quell the revolt. He was a contributor to the Albanian League of Prizren in 1878. Dervish Pasha ordered the arrest of some of Albanian League notables and tribal chieftains for disobedience which included Doda.

=== Exile ===
Doda was exiled to Anatolia by the Ottoman government and later given a post of Brigadier General in the palace of Sultan Abdul Hamid II. While in Istanbul, Doda had become a member of the Young Turks. He was released in 1908, after the Young Turk Revolution and the new Ottoman government thought that Doda's freedom would assist in gaining the support of the Mirdita tribe. Local Muslim and Christian Albanian highlanders (Malisors) viewed Doda's return as more important than the Ottoman constitution. The local Young Turk (CUP) branch in Shkodër, under pressure from local tribal chieftains, chose to obtain Doda's release for Mirdita in return for supporting the new constitutional government.

=== Return from exile ===
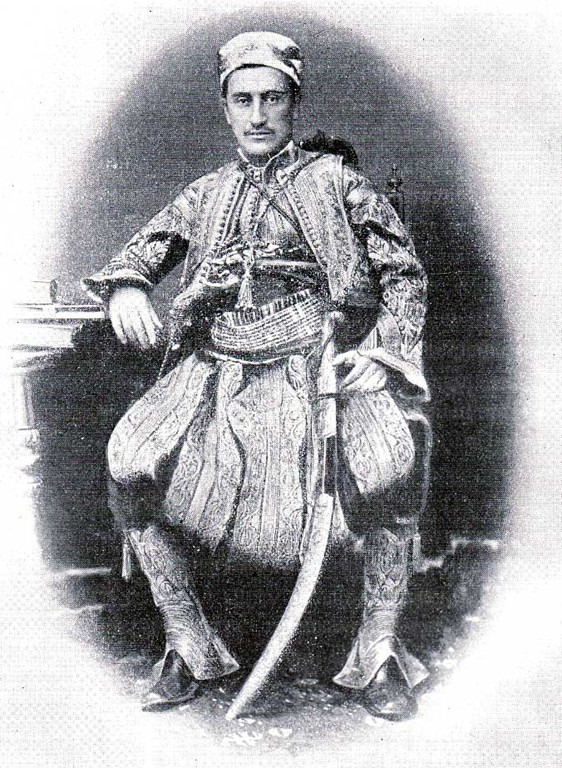
Prenk Bib Doda (1890s)

Doda's return to Mirdita consisted of a visit to Shkodër meeting Young Turk members and wiring the Grand vizier that he would work toward gaining support of the tribes for the new government and to create a CUP branch in Mirdita. He also expressed uncertainties with his relationship with the tribe and the local vali while he advised the government to govern the region fairly. Back in the region, Doda accompanied by two CUP members met with members of Mirdita's five bajraktars (2,500 men) on 30 September at the church of St. Paul where the abbot gave a speech on the cessation of blood feuds until Ash Wednesday (28 March 1909) and he backed those pronouncements. Edith Durham, an English traveler present at the meeting noticed that Doda, dressed in an Ottoman fez and uniform felt unease and awkward around his surroundings after thirty years of exile such as recoiling in surprise at the sound of gun fire by fellow tribesmen hailing his arrival. During the Albanian alphabet Congress of Monastir of 1908, Doda sent a telegram of support for the Bashkimi Alphabet which he viewed practical for communication and commerce.

Doda offered assistance from his tribe during the 31 March Incident to quell the uprising and these sentiments where more due to fears that the Hamidian regime could return than loyalty toward the CUP. By 1911, Doda was a deputy in the Ottoman parliament and had expressed concerns to the Austro-Hungarian ambassador Johann von Pallavicini in Istanbul about possible partition of Albania by its neighbours Bulgaria, Montenegro and Serbia. Relations with the Young Turks broke down and Doda received overtures of support from Montenegro to establish an autonomous Catholic Albanian state provided he assisted Montenegrin forces during the Balkan Wars. Doda having fallen led rebellions against the empire, on October 26, 1911 he founded in Mirdita a Provision Government of Albania together with Terenzio Tocci, overruled by the Ottomans at that time.

=== Independent Albania ===
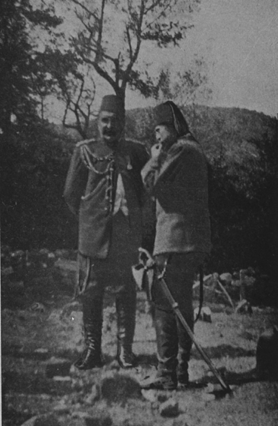
Prenk Bib Doda after his return from exile with an Ottoman Young Turk official (1909)

In order to gain support of the Mirdita Catholic volunteers from the northern mountains during the Muslim Uprising in Albania in 1914 Prince of Wied appointed Doda to be the foreign minister of the Principality of Albania. The government was paying a force of 5,000 to 7,000 under Doda's command. Doda's volunteers and the International Dutch Gendarmerie were also joined by Isa Boletini and his men, mostly from Kosovo, as well as 2,000 tribesmen of Mat under the command of Ahmet Zogu.

Dutch gendarmes together with Doda's northern Mirdita Catholics attempted to capture Shijak, but when they engaged the rebels on May 23, they were surrounded and captured, as well as another expedition from Durrës which attempted to release the captured gendarmes. Another expedition failed on June 23, around 15 miles north of Durrës near Slinzë, where Prenk himself was captured by the rebels and then released on parole. There were rumors that he was a traitor to Prince Wilhelm, and he laid down arms and went voluntarily to the rebels.

After World War I, he served as Deputy Prime Minister in the government of Turhan Pasha Permeti.

In 1918, at the Congress of Durrës, Doda was elected vice president. He was in a very tense relationship with the Italian authorities established in Albania, and in a very good relations with the British diplomats. On 22 March 1919, while traveling from Durrës to Shëngjin in company of British diplomat Eden, he was targeted and killed in an ambush.

== See also ==
- Prenk
- Republic of Mirdita
- Ottoman military reform efforts
- Catholicism in Albania
