= Bib Dod Pasha =

Ottoman ruler

Kapedan Bib Doda Pasha Pasha
- Bib Dodë
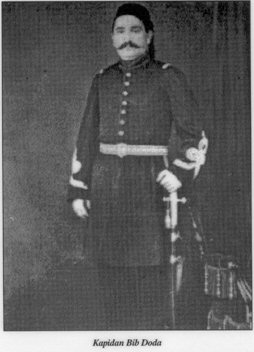
- Born: Bibë Doda; 1820; Orosh, Mirdita, Ottoman Empire (present-day Albania)
- Died: 1868 (aged 47–48)
- Resting place: Shkodër
- Occupation: Clan chief
- Title: Kapedan of the Mirdita; Head of the Gjonmarkaj clan
- Predecessor: Gjok Doda
- Successor: Prenk Bib Doda
- Parent: Gjok Doda

Bib Doda Pasha (1820–1868) was the ruler of Mirdita. He held the Ottoman rank of kapedan (captain) and the honorific pasha (governor).

== Family ==
Bib Doda belonged to the Gjonmarkaj clan which had led Mirdita for a long period. He started ruling his clan at a young age, since his father Gjok Doda was murdered. He married a Muslim woman, Hide (daughter of Hasan Ajazi), from Armalle village in the Lurë region. He was the father of Prenk Bib Doda, who would later play an important role in the Albanian politics of the early 20th century.

== Agreement with Serbia ==
Bib Doda Pasha together with influential abbot Gaspër Krasniqi and Mark Prenk Lleshi from Mirdita, as representatives of Mirdita, reached an agreement with Serbian Internal Minister Ilija Garašanin in 1849 regarding cooperation with Serbia and Montenegro against the Ottoman Empire. Garašanin believed that Albania should be established as an independent state. The eventual Albanian state was to encompass territories between rivers Drin and Vjosë.

== Activities against Albanian rebels ==
Bib Doda Pasha aided the Ottoman raids against the Albanian rebels of Dervish Cara, during the Albanian Revolt of 1843–44 in the sanjaks of Prizren, Scutari and Ohrid. He played a significant role in the expedition, and was decorated and awarded an honorary sabre and pistols. Doda received the title "Pasha" in 1849 and allowed to maintain an army up to 10,000 people.

His name came in the center of attention during the Montenegrin–Ottoman War (1861–62). Northern Albanian Catholic tribes were organized to start an uprising against the Ottomans led by abbot Gaspër Krasniqi, with the support of French emissaries of Napoleon III. Bib Doda who was still getting paid well by the Ottomans was not convinced of the benefits of the uprising and stayed out, thus not staying by his previous agreement with Garašanin. In spring 1862 he even tried to recruit some volunteers to aid the Ottomans. This led to a general mistrust and rage against him. Mirdita rebels raided and burnt his properties in Kallmet. Meanwhile, other rebels cut the roads that connected Shkodra with Prizren. Ottomans intervened and Gaspër Krasniqi was arrested. The Albanian uprising did not happen.

== Death ==
With the death of Bib Doda Pasha in 1868, the Ottomans assigned a kaymakam from his own family, but removed his young son Prenk and exiled him to Turkey. He was buried in Shkodër.

== Legacy ==
Bib Doda Pasha was regarded by the Albanians as a "murderer of his own people", in particular his role in the Uprising of Dervish Cara. There were allegations that the British and Austro-Hungarians were behind all this, interested in having the Ottoman Empire still strong in the Balkans.

== Sources ==
- SANU (1985). Posebna izdanja. Srpska akademija nauka i umetnosti.
- Stojančević, Vladimir (1990a). Srbija i Albanci u XIX i početkom XX veka: ciklus predavanja 10–25. novembar 1987. Srpska akademija nauka i umetnosti. ISBN 9788670250949.
- Stojančević, Vladimir (1990b). Srbija i oslobodilački pokret na Balkanskom poluostrvu u XIX veku. Zavod za udžbenike i nastavna sredstva.
- Stojančević, Vladimir (1991). Ilija Garašanin (1812–1874): recueil des travaux du colloque scientifique organisé les 9 et 10 décembre 1987 a l'occasion du 175e anniversaire de sa naissance. SANU. ISBN 9788670250352.
