= Kimza Government =

Organized government in Albania

Qeveria e Kimzës
- Government of Kimza
- 1911–1912
- Date formed: 27 April 1911
- Date dissolved: 28 November 1912

People and organisations
- Leader: Terenc Toçi
- Total no. of members: 24

History
- Election: Kuvendi i Fanit
- Successor: Provisional Government

The Kimza Government (Albanian: Ceveria e Pertasheme Shkipeniis) was the first organized government to formally declare the Independence of Albania from the Ottoman Empire.

== Background ==
For the first time since the death of Albanian national hero Skanderbeg, an organized gathering of representatives from the northern bajraks took part in the establishment of a unified government. They hailed from the following settlements: Spaç, Fan, Gojan, Orosh, Kushnen, Kthellë, Shkodër, Dibërr, Mërtur, Berish, Shalë, Shosh, Thaç, Toplanë, Theth and Nikaj.

The head of the Kimza government, Arbëresh lawyer and activist Terenc Toçi, sought to stage a "revolution" uprising from north to south to "have a single spirit, a flag, simultaneity of action and discipline and to persuade the civilized world to intervene in our interests". Toçi selected the indigenous Mirditë region in order to form a national nucleus ”that would also serve as a spark for a pan-Albanian movement.

== Fan Assembly ==
The cross-regional assembly held in Fan, Mirditë on April 26, 1911, created the first government for the independence of the nation:

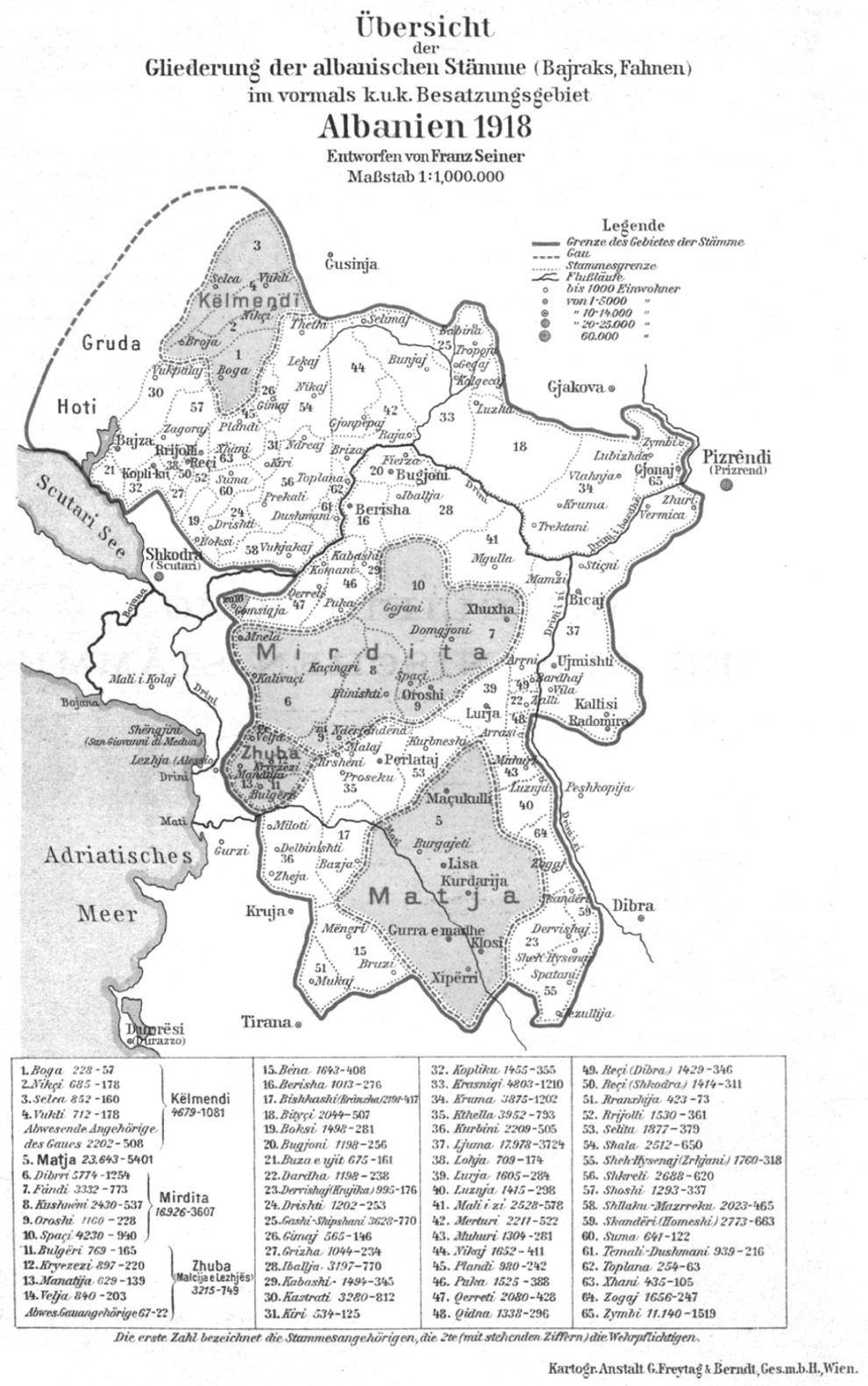
Map of the Northern Albanian Bajraks in 1918.

The undersigned, thinking as the whole population, the whole Albanian nation, as Christians and Muslims, have all the rights and reasons to be exalted and glorified as a free and independent state, that has been delayed to the Albanian nation.

This opinion expresses our desires from all regions of the country to declare Albania free and independent in its borders, with its history, with its language and its nation. To establish the Provisional Government of Albania, giving Mr.Terenc Toçi the leadership and full freedom as needed for the leadership of this Government.

The Provisional Government will organize the struggle until the complete liberation of the country and the formation of the Permanent Government and the election of the form of regime: republic or kingdom, as well as the organization of all affairs of the country.

Any evil, unreasonable deed that may be done against the interim Governors and foreigners to come will be punishable by death. The seat of the Provisional Government will initially be in Kimëz.

== Government ==
Members of the provisional government for independence that was created in the tower premises of Zef Ndoi, in Mirditë, signed the act of the declaration of independence by signature, seal or fingerprint:

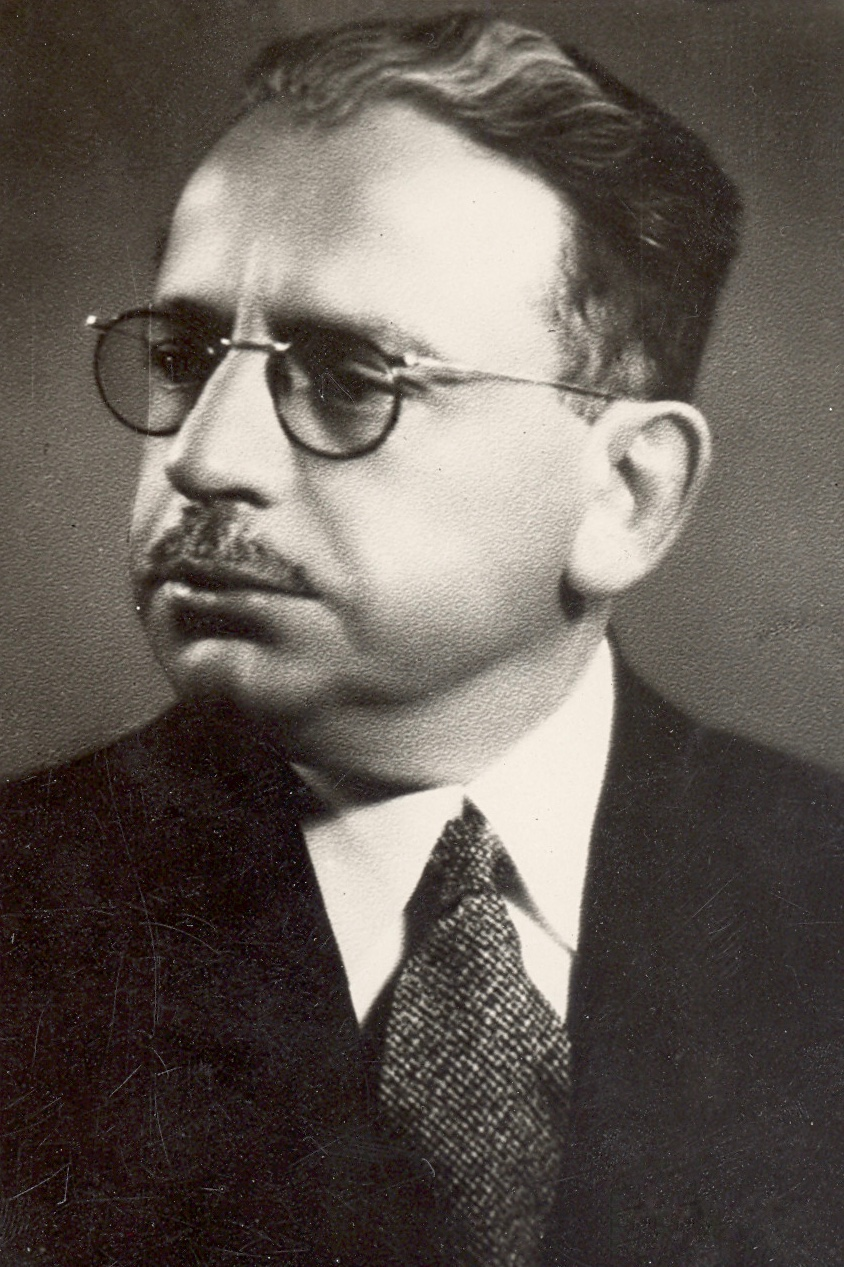
Terenc Toçi was the head of the provisional government

Kimza Government
Terenc Toçi – Arbëresh (signature)
Preng Tuc Doda – Fan
Ded Frroku – Kushnen
Ndue Përdeda – Gojan (seal)
Dod Bardhoku – Kthellë (seal)
Kol Marka Kola – Orosh (fingerprint)
Preng Marka Prenga – Orosh (fingerprint)
Marash Nika – Shalë (seal)
Gjelosh Kola – Shosh (seal)
Pren Uka – Berish (seal)
Frrok Kola – Thaç (seal)
Sadri Luka – Theth (seal)
Gjon Difi – Mërtur (fingerprint)
Mark Sokoli – Nikaj (fingerprint)
Qerim Ndou – Toplanë (fingerprint)
Prel Tuli – Mërtur (fingerprint)
Ndue Marka Lleshi – Fan (fingerprint signed on his behalf by Kol Marka Kola)
Ndue Frrok Deda – Spaç (fingerprint)
Zef Ndoi – Kimëz (fingerprint)
Ndue Ndre Lazri – Dibërr
Ndue Gjon Ndoci – Kushnen
Geg Filip Çuni – Shkodër
Preng Marka Gjeta – Kthellë
Ndrec Gjegja – Kthellë

== Aftermath ==
The Provisional Government of Kimza paved the way for the declaration of independence in Vlorë on December 28, 1912. Its leader, Terenc Toçi was subsequently shot and killed on April 14, 1945 by a decision of the special court of the communist regime for being a fascist collaborator. His remains were found on a hill in the outskirts of Tirana.
