= Uprising of Dervish Cara =

19th-century uprising in northern Ottoman Albania

Albanian Revolt of 1843–1844
- Part of the Albanian revolts against the Ottoman Empire
Date	1843–1844
Location	Ottoman Albania; Modern-day northern Albania, Kosovo, south-eastern Serbia, and western North Macedonia
Result	Ottoman victory

Belligerents
Ottoman Empire	Albanian Rebels

Commanders and leaders
Hayredin Pasha; Omar Pasha; Bib Doda Pasha, Kapedan of Mirdita	Dervish Cara; Sheh Mustafa Zerqani; Salë Markja; Bajram Vaksinca; Cen Leka; Sulejman Vokshi

Strength
30,000; Unknown number of irregulars	c. 10,000

Casualties and losses
Unknown	Unknown

The Uprising of Dervish Cara (1843–1844; Albanian: Kryengritja e Dervish Carës) was a 19th-century uprising in northern Ottoman Albania directed against the Ottoman Tanzimat reforms which started in 1839 and were gradually being put in action in the regions of Albania. Some historians include the actions in Dibër of the same time under the same historical name, though the events in Dibër were independent and headed by other leaders.

== Background ==
The Tanzimat reforms began in 1839, and aimed to modernize the Ottoman Empire by introducing European-inspired reforms. Most importantly, it involved a centralization and streamlining of the administration and military. This hurt the old-established feudal order (cf. timariots and sipahis) among the Empire's Muslim communities, and especially the various local leaders who had exercised considerable regional authority and often enjoyed wide-ranging autonomy from the imperial government. The Albanians had long been a source of manpower for the Ottomans, providing both soldiers and statesmen such as the Köprülü family. The Tanzimat reforms however; in particular the replacement of influential local leaders by Ottoman functionaries, the imposition of new taxes, the compulsory recruitment into the regular army, and the attempt to disarm the general population; caused much resentment, and led to a series of disorders throughout the western Balkan provinces in 1840–43.

In the summer of 1843, the inhabitants of Prizren attacked and routed the new officials of the city and their example was followed by the inhabitants of Priştine (now Pristina) and Yakova (now Gjakova). These local insurrections in the cities were immediately suppressed by Ottoman authorities.

== The uprising ==
The direct cause of the uprising was the arresting and liquidation of the local Albanophone pashas, most notably that of Abdurrahman Pasha of Kalkandelen (now Tetovo) and his two brothers, Havzi Pasha of Üsküb (now Skopje) and Hussein Pasha of Kustendil. The rebels, who were led by Dervish Cara, also had the support of other Albanophone pashas. The revolt began in Üsküb in July 1843 and grew strongly when an Ottoman army under Hajredin Pasha, in the process of opposing it, tried to recruit local Albanians into the regular army. In November the rebels liberated Gostivar and in January 1844, after bitter fights with the Ottoman army, they captured Kalkandelen. In February 1844 the rebels attacked and captured Üsküb. They created a Great Council led by Dervish Cara which was the supreme body of the newly created administration in the liberated territories. In February 1844 the rebels took Kumanova. After Kumanova the rebels captured Preševo, Bujanovac, Vranje, Leskovac and other territories now in Serbia. The rebellion was spread to Pejë, Gjakovë, Prizren and Shkodër, while in the spring of 1844 the rebellion reached Ohri (now Ohrid) and Manastiri in the south, İşkodra in the west, Vranje and Leskovac in the north and Kumanova in the east. The rebels sent a letter to the Albanians of the Sanjak of Ioannina, recalling them as brothers and asking them not to fight for the Ottoman army.

Fearing a further extension of the rebellion, the Ottoman government tried to gain some time through negotiations. The requests of the rebels were:

- Abolish the military levy for Albanian recruitments
- Replacement of Ottoman functionaries who didn't know the Albanian language with local Albanians.
- Recognition of the autonomy of Albania, just like the Ottoman government did with the Serbians in 1830.

The requests of the rebels were not accepted. In a move to disunite the rebels, the Ottoman government declared an amnesty, the abolishment of the new taxes and the postponement of the recruitment process, which would become voluntary in the future. A promise was made by the Ottoman commander in chief Omer Pasha to the Albanians that if they handed over their arms, they would receive the same rights as the Serbs in 1830, which meant autonomy. At the same time an Ottoman army of 30,000 men, led by Omer Pasha, was sent to Monastir. Bib Doda, Kepadan of Mirdita tribe (a primarily catholic region in northern Albania), came with his men to aid to the Ottomans as a sign of loyalty to the Porte, playing an important role in the fights. In May 1844 the Ottoman army attacked the rebels, forcing them to retreat to the areas of Kalkandelen, Üsküb and Kumanova. Heavy fighting took place from 13 to 17 May 1844 in Katlanovo Pass, and on 18 May in Katlanovo thermals. Given the disparity of numbers and their lack of artillery, the rebels could no longer resist the superior Ottoman army. On 21 May 1844 the Ottoman army entered Üsküb, where many reprisals took place. During May–June, after bitter struggle with the rebels the Ottoman army retook Kumanova, Preševo, Bujanovac, Vranje, Kalkandelen and Gostivar whilst in July the Ottoman army captured all areas ranging from Kačanik to Pristina. Dervish Cara was captured by Ottoman forces in summer 1844.

== Actions in Dibër ==
The capture of Dervish Cara didn't put an end to the rebellion, which continued in the areas of Dibër and Shkodër. The resistance was very strong especially in Dibër under its local leaders. In the fall of 1844, the Ottoman army was concentrated against the rebels in the Sanjak of Dibra. Ottoman forces led by Rexhep Pasha were defeated by the rebels in the field of Mavrova. The rebels in the Sanjak of Dibër were led from Sheh Mustafa Zerqani, a Bektashi priest. In a meeting in November 1844 they declared that the old autonomy of Dibër was not to be changed. The rebel army led by Cen Leka tried to stop the advancing Ottoman army led by Hayredin Pasha. The Ottoman commander declared again an amnesty, the abolishment of the new taxes and the postponement of the recruitment process which would become voluntary in the future. The greatest resistance happened during the Battle of Gjuricë, which lasted for five days. According to the report of a French diplomat in Ioannina, even women and children participated in the battle. The Ottoman army suffered a great number of losses but due to their great superiority in numbers and armaments, they succeeded in forcing the rebels to retreat from the battle. The reprisals from the Ottoman army forced a large number of people to leave their homes. Although the rebellion was crushed, the Ottoman government postponed the application of Tanzimat for the Sanjak of Dibër and Shkodër. Dervish Cara together with other local leaders was sentenced to death, but this punishment was later transformed into a lifetime sentence.

As a sign of appreciation for his support, Bid Doda of Mirdita was decorated and awarded an honorary sabre and pistols. He was given the title "Pasha" and allowed to maintain an army up to 10,000 people.

== Legacy ==
The song on Hayredin Pasha remembering the Battle of Gjuricë is famous among Albanians and continues to be sung even nowadays.

== See also ==
- Albanian Revolt of 1845
- Albanian Revolt of 1847
