= Prenk =

Albanian language title

Prenk, also prënk, prek is Albanian language title of the chieftain of Catholic Mirdite clan and also a given name. In the 19th century it was hereditary position of the heads of Gjomarkaj family who had the official title of prenk paşa (English: Prince Lord). Members of this clan lived on the territory of the Sanjak of Shkoder and their chieftain was obliged to provide 5,000 troops to Ottomans upon notice. It is used by Catholic Albanians of all regions.

According to one 19th-century travel account Prenk was corruption of Peter that "from time immemorial has been the first baptismal name of nearly all chiefs of this tribe".

List of notable people with this title includes:

- Prenk Bib Doda, Mirdita clan leader, politician
- Prenk Doçi, Albanian Rilindas
- Prenk Pervizi, military figure of 20th century
- Prenk Cali, Kelmendi warlord
