= Cen Leka =

Cen Leka (Albanian: Cen Leka) was an Albanian rebel and leader of the uprising from 1843 to 1844 in Dibër County.

== Biography ==
Cen Leka was born in the village of Zogje in Dibër. He led the Albanians in Dibër in revolt against the Tanzimat reforms. Leka's rebel army attempted to stop the advance of the Ottoman army led by Haireddin Pasha. The rebels offered the greatest resistance in the Battle of Gjorice, which lasted for five days. According to the report of a French diplomat in Yanina, women and children even participated in the battle. The Ottoman army suffered significant losses so severely, that it was forced to retreat for another 2 years. But due to its overwhelming superiority in manpower and weaponry, the Ottoman army later returned not in Dibër, but through Librazhd south of Dibër. There is an Albanian folk song dedicated to the battle Called “Hajredin Pasha”.
