= Dervish Cara =

Albanian revolutionary leader and activist involved in the Albanian National Awakening

- Dervish Carë
- Born: Early 19th century Dolno Palčište, Rumelia Eyalet, Ottoman Empire
- Died: Late 19th century Constantinople, Ottoman Empire
- Occupation: Revolutionary
- Known for: Leader of the Albanian Revolt of 1843–1844. Also known as the Uprising of Dervish Cara
- Movement: Albanian National Awakening
- Opponent: Ottoman Empire
- Criminal charge: High treason against Sultan Abdülmecid I
- Criminal penalty: Sentenced to death; later reduced to lifetime imprisonment

Dervish Cara was an Albanian revolutionary leader known for his role in the Albanian Revolt of 1844, a revolt also known by his name as "the Uprising of Dervish Cara".
