= KF Çakllani =

- Full name: Klubi Futbollistik Çakllani
- Founded: 2015; 10 years ago
- Ground: Pallçisht Stadium
- Capacity: 500

KF Çakllani is a football club based in the village of Pallçisht i Epërm, Bogovinje Municipality, North Macedonia. They were recently competed in the Macedonian Third League (West Division).
