= Orosh =

- Administrative unit
- Location within Albania
- Coordinates: 41°51′N 20°4′E
- Country: Albania
- County: Lezhë
- Municipality: Mirditë

Population (2023)
  - Administrative unit: 900
- Time zone: UTC+1 (CET)
  - Summer (DST): UTC+2 (CEST)

Orosh (or Albanian: Oroshi) is a small village in Mirditë within the county of Lezhë in the northwest of the Republic of Albania. Geographically, it is located inside the mountainous region of northern Albania in the Valley of Fan.

The seat of the former municipality was the town of Reps. The former Orosh Abbey was located in the municipality. Terenzio Tocci gathered the Mirdita chieftains on April 26, 1911, in Orosh, proclaimed the independence of Albania, raised the flag of Albania and established the provisional government.

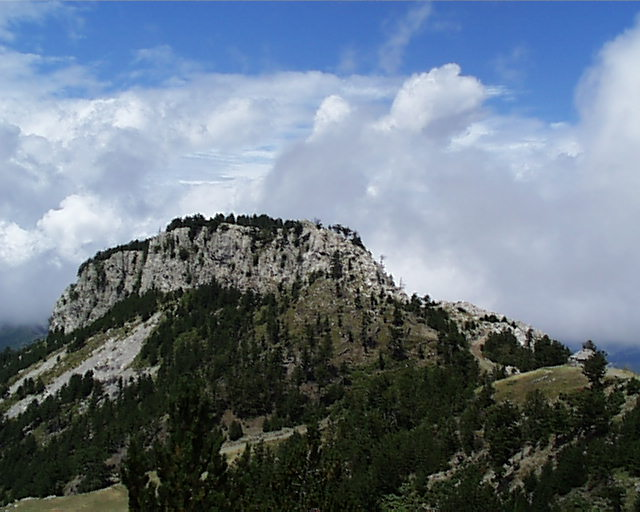
Malet e Shenjtit close to Orosh

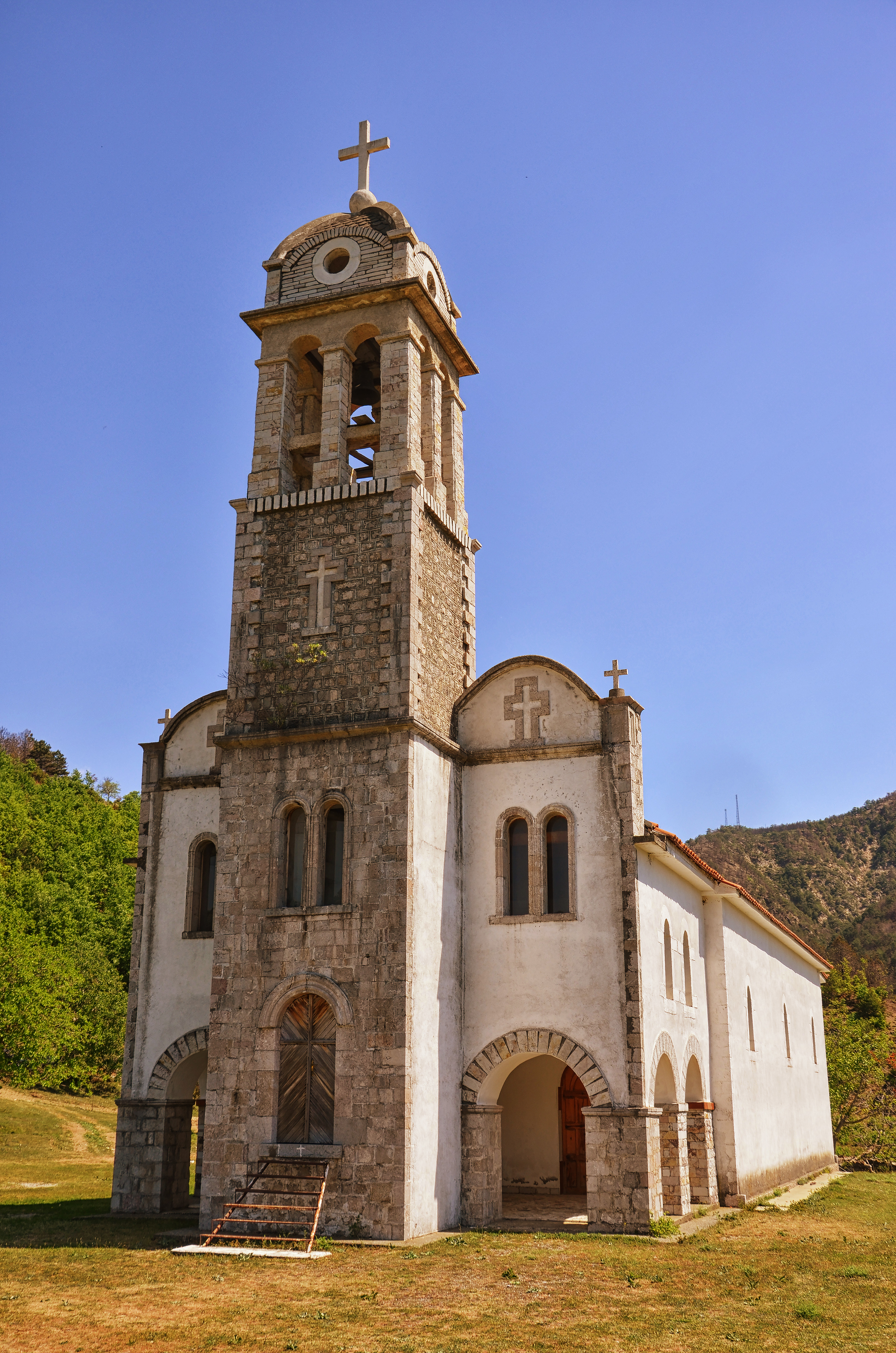
The new church of Orosh

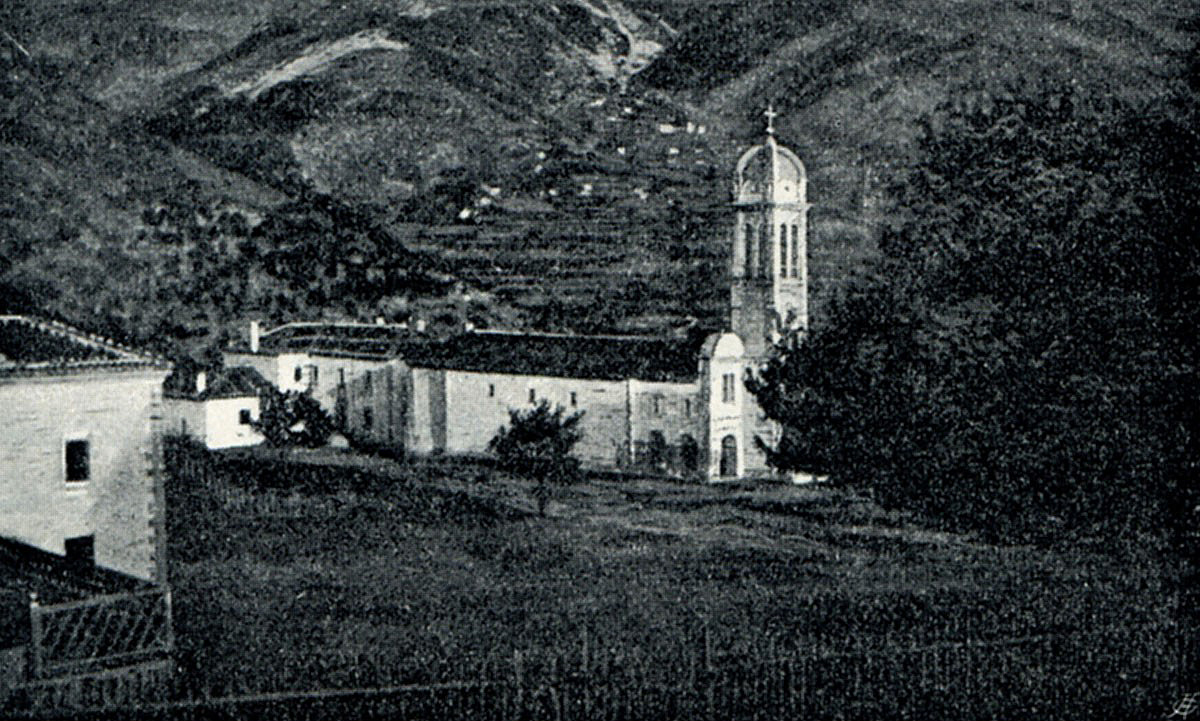
The church of Orosh in 1903

== Notable people ==
- Prenk Bibë Doda (1860–1919), member of the Young Turks, prince of Mirdita and politician
- Marka Gjoni (1861–1925), chieftain of the Mirdita region
- Gjon Markagjoni (1888–1966), Catholic clan chieftain
- Bib Dod Pasha (1820–1868), ruler of the Mirdita region
