= Marka Gjoni =

Albanian chieftain of Mirdita (1861–1925)

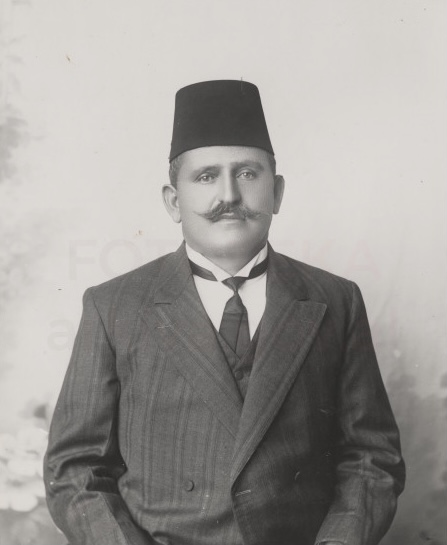
Portrait of Marka Gjoni

Kapedan Marka Gjoni (1861-1925) was the chieftain of the Mirdita region and tribe in North Albania. He was born in Orosh. He was assigned as Kaymakam of Mirdita by the Ottoman Empire during the absence of Prenk Bibë Doda who was interned in Anatolia due to his participation in the Albanian League of Prizren.

Marka Gjoni is mostly remembered for the short-lived Mirdita Republic of 1921.
