= Dolno Palčište =

Dolno Palčište Долно Палчиште Pallçisht i Poshtëm
- Village
- Location within Republic of Macedonia
- Coordinates: 41°58′N 20°56′E
- Country: North Macedonia
- Region: Polog
- Municipality: Bogovinje

Population (2021)
  - Total: 2,563
- Time zone: UTC+1 (CET)
  - Summer (DST): UTC+2 (CEST)
- Car plates: TE
- Website: .

Dolno Palčište (Macedonian: Долно Палчиште, Albanian: Pallçisht i Poshtëm) is a village in the municipality of Bogovinje, North Macedonia.

== History ==
Dolno Palčište is attested in the 1467/68 Ottoman tax registry (defter) for the Nahiyah of Kalkandelen. The village had a total of 22 Christian households, 2 bachelors and 3 widows.

According to the 1467-68 Ottoman defter, Dolno Palčište exhibits Orthodox Christian Slavic anthroponomy.

== Demographics ==
As of the 2021 census, Dolno Palčište had 2,563 residents with the following ethnic composition:

- Albanians 1,829
- Turks 3
- Macedonians 12
- Persons for whom data are taken from administrative sources 91
- Others 2

According to the 2002 census, the village had a total of 3,345 inhabitants. Ethnic groups in the village include:

- Albanians 3,302
- Macedonians 24
- Others 19

According to the 1942 Albanian census, Dolno Palčište was inhabited by 498 Muslim Albanians.

In statistics gathered by Vasil Kanchov in 1900, the village of Dolno Palčište was inhabited by 200 Christian Bulgarians and 170 Muslim Albanians.

== Sports ==
The local football club KF Çakllani used to play in the Macedonian Third Football League.
