= Mirdita, Gostivar =

Mirdita Мирдита Mirëdita
- Village
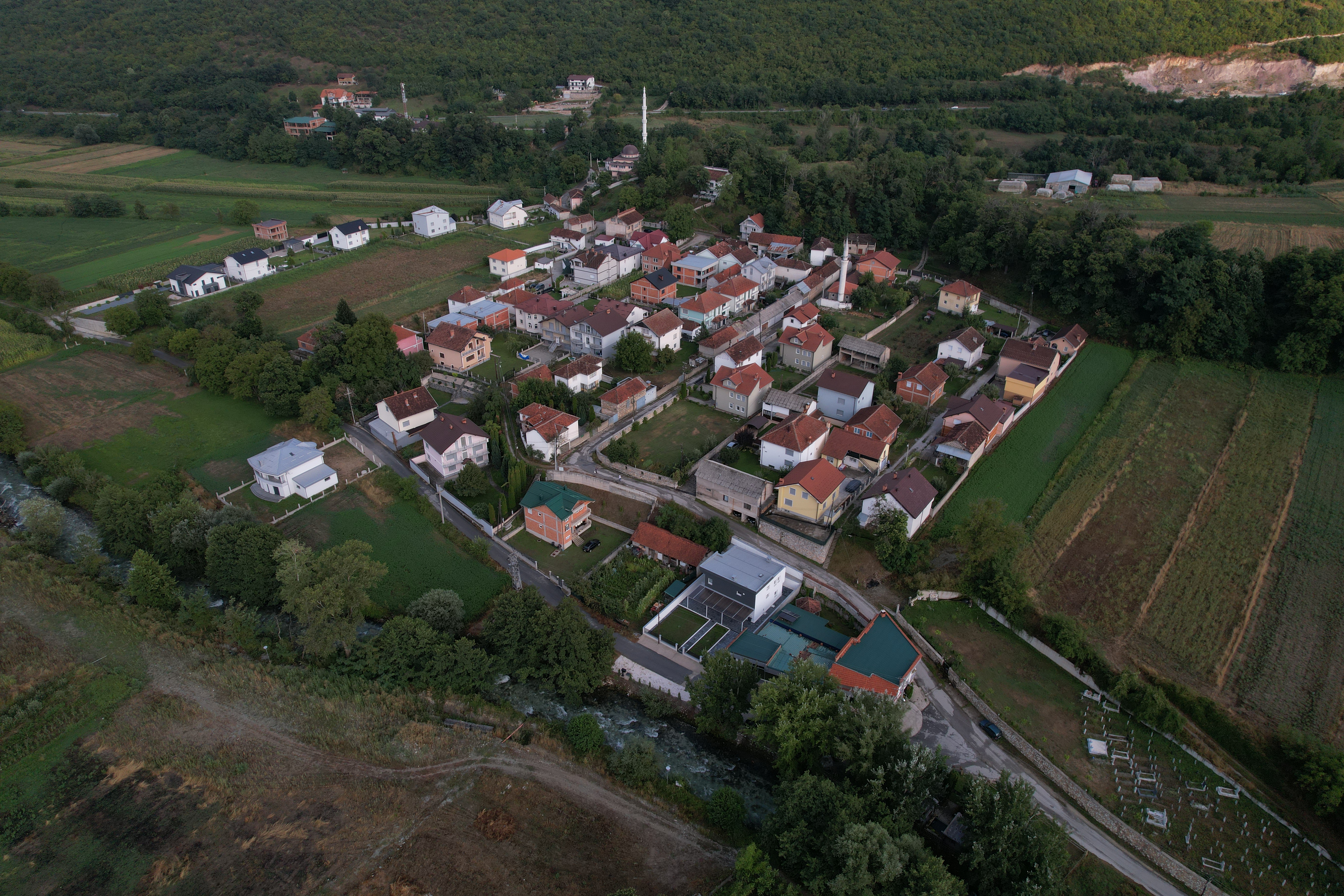

- Location within North Macedonia
- Coordinates: 41°46′4″N 20°51′42″E
- Country: North Macedonia
- Region: Polog
- Municipality: Gostivar

Population (2021)
  - Total: 57
- Time zone: UTC+1 (CET)
  - Summer (DST): UTC+2 (CEST)
- Car plates: GV
- Website: .

Mirdita (Macedonian: Мирдита, Albanian: Mirëdita; until 2014 Merdita, Macedonian: Мердита) is a village in the municipality of Gostivar, North Macedonia.

== Demographics ==
As of the 2021 census, Mirdita had 151 residents with the following ethnic composition:

- Albanians 150
- Persons for whom data are taken from administrative sources 1
