= Terenzio Tocci =

Albanian politician

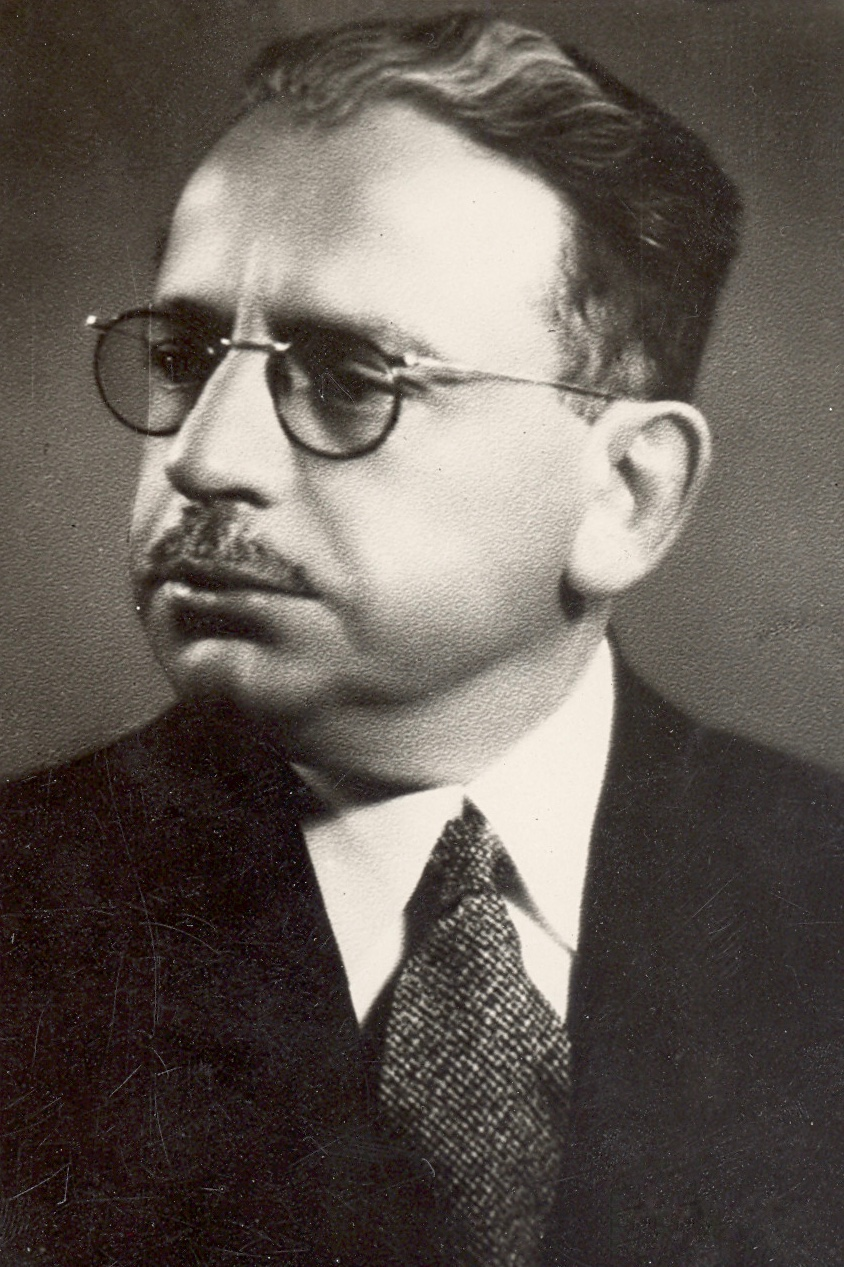

7th Speaker of the Parliament of Albania
- In office 9 April 1940 – 23 November 1942
- Preceded by: Pandeli Evangjeli
- Succeeded by: Ernest Koliqi

Personal details
- Born: 9 March 1880 San Cosmo Albanese, Calabria, Kingdom of Italy
- Died: 14 March 1945 (aged 65) Tirana, Albania

Terenzio Tocci (Albanian: Terenc Toçi; 9 March 1880 – 14 March 1945) was an Italo-Albanian politician of Arbëresh origins. Distinguished for patriotic activities before the Albanian independence he went on to serve during World War II as Chairman of the Superior Fascist Corporative Council (Albanian: Këshilli i Epërm Korporativ Fashist) from 1940 to 1943. In 1945 Tocci was condemned in communist Albania for high treason and collaboration with fascism and sentenced to death.

== Biography ==
Terenzio Tocci was born on 9 March 1880 in San Cosmo Albanese, Calabria, Kingdom of Italy of Arbëresh birth. He received a degree in law. In 1908-09 he went to the United States and conducted a campaign of sensibilization for the Albanian-Americans on the necessity of Albania's independence.

Later on Tocci went to Albania and participated in the Albanian Revolt of 1910 and that of 1911. On 26/27 April 1911 in Orosh, Tocci gathered the Mirditë chieftains and proclaimed the independence of Albania, raised the flag of Albania and established a provisional government. After Ottoman troops entered the area to put down the rebellion, Tocci fled the empire abandoning his activities.

He was one of the participants of the Albanian Congress of Trieste in 1913.

Tocci served in Albanian governments of King Zog prior to the Italian Invasion as Minister of National Economy.

During the Italian presence in Albania in World War II Tocci served at the Superior Fascist Corporative Council (Albanian: Këshilli i Epërm Korporativ Fashist) as a member of the parliament, most notably as its Chairman from 1940 to 1943.

After World War II Tocci was accused in Communist Albania for high treason and collaboration with Nazi Germany. The trial started on March 1, 1945, and was headed by Koçi Xoxe, then head of the political police. It is not known if Tocci was given the chance to defend himself in trial. The verdict was given on March 13, 1945. Tocci, along with 16 other people, were sentenced to death. The execution occurred one day later, on March 14, 1945. Tocci and the others were all thrown in a common grave.
