= Albanian–Yugoslav border war (1921) =

1921 war

- Part of the Interwar period
Date	17 July – 20 November 1921
Location	Principality of Albania
Result	Yugoslav victory
Territorial changes	Incorporation of Gora, Has, Debar and surroundings into Yugoslavia

Belligerents
Albania; Diplomatic Support: Italy League of Nations	Yugoslavia; Republic of Mirdita; Greece; Army of Wrangel

Commanders and leaders
Pandeli Evangjeli; Ahmet Zog	Peter I # Alexander I Marka Gjoni (surrendered); Constantine I

Strength
Unknown troop strength	Unknown troop strength Unknown number of secessionists 1,200–12,000 troops 1,200 Serbian and Russian Mercenaries

Casualties and losses
Unknown number of casualties	Unknown number of casualties

The Albanian–Yugoslav border war of 1921 arose from disputes over the borders of the newly established Principality of Albania after the First Balkan War. Although the 1913 Treaty of London outlined general territorial terms for Albania, precise borders remained unresolved amid the chaos of World War I, the Paris Peace Conference, and the League of Nations' formation. With the League failing to reach a verdict for a year, Yugoslavia, spurred by the Mirdita rebellion, asserted territorial claims and deployed troops to the border. As tensions escalated, League intervention became imperative. The conflict concluded after the United Kingdom recognized Albania, prompting Yugoslavia to withdraw its forces. Subsequently, diplomatic ties were established between Albania and Yugoslavia, leading to Yugoslavia's acknowledgment of Albanian sovereignty.

== Background ==
At the conclusion of the First Balkan War in 1913, the Treaty of London was signed which dealt with the territorial adjustments of the Balkan region and among others, established the rough borders as well as recognizing the independence of Albania. The refining of Albania's borders were to be determined by the Great Powers, however progress was halted due to the outbreak of the First World War. The frontiers of the newly established Principality of Albania had not been set during the Paris Peace Conference, leaving the issue to be resolved by the newly formed League of Nations in 1920. When the final decision regarding Albania's borders had not yet been determined by the following year, the situation quickly became unstable due to unrest both within and outside Albania's proposed borders.

In 1919, Mirditas Prince Preng Bib Doda, the chief (Kapidan) of the Catholic region captaincy of Mirdita, was killed near the marshes of Lezha and left no clear heir. Marka Gjoni, a relative, became the successor to the position of chief (Kapidan). However, many of Mirdita's leaders refused to recognize him, and he lacked popularity within the tribe because of accusations of cowardice shown during the First World War. He allowed the Yugoslav authorities to proclaim, in his name, the independence of the Republic of Mirdita in July 1921 in Prizren, Yugoslavia.

== Rebellion in Mirdita ==
Flag of the Republic of Mirdita (1921)

Marka Gjoni, a chieftain of the predominantly Catholic Mirdita region and tribe in Northern Albania, believed that the new Albanian government was going to ban Catholicism. These fears were worsened by plans to dissolve Mirdita into three separated prefectures. As a result, he allowed Yugoslav authorities on his behalf to proclaim the Mirdita Republic on July 17, 1921 in Prizren, Yugoslavia. The leaders of Mirdita decided that Mirdita would be proclaimed the Republic of Mirdita, with a President, a Constitution, and an Administration. Gjoni received Yugoslav support, weapons and money from the Yugoslav government who saw the newly founded republic as a helpful asset in their efforts to weaken the Albanian state by aiding separatism and fueling religious unrest, in order to negotiate a more advantageous border demarcation between Albania's territory and their own. Gjoni urged the Yugoslav government to take steps to secure the recognition of the Mirdita republic, but Yugoslavia was mainly interested in seeking potential territorial claims to the republic itself. Greece also gave recognition to the Mirdita republic. Mirdita's self-government consisted of Gjoni as President, Anton Ashiku as Minister of Foreign Affairs, Preng Lleshi as Minister of War and Zef Ndoci as Minister of Home Affairs.

At the League of Nations, the Yugoslav government accused the Albanian government of holding only the interest of the Muslim population in mind while suppressing the country's Catholic population. Albania's government responded by stating that it represented all Albanians regardless of religious beliefs. The Yugoslav government argued that due to the existence of the Mirdita republic, the Albanian response was invalid and threw Albania's status of being a country into question, thus affecting its potential membership in the League. The Yugoslav delegation stated that while two governments existed in Albania, a unity between the people could not exist.

The events of the Republic of Mirdita coincided with international negotiations on finalizing the Albanian-Yugoslav border, which participants considered important, and these discussions continued through November 1921. Gjoni asked the Yugoslav authorities to take steps to secure recognition of the Republic of Mirdita, while the Yugoslavs hoped that the rebellion in northern Albania would support their territorial claims in the region.

== Escalation of hostilities ==
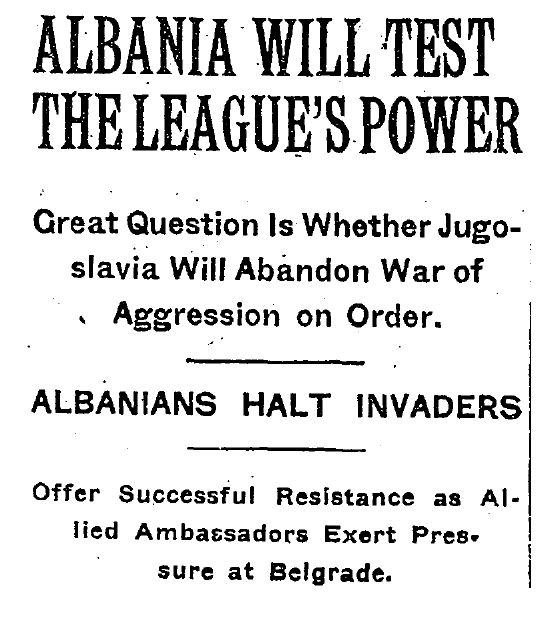
A New York Times headline from 9 November 1921 about the Yugoslav incursion in Albania.

The Albanian government viewed the existence of the Mirdita republic as a violation of the sovereignty of the Albanian state. As a result, it began preparing troops to quash the rebellion. Meanwhile, in August 1921, representatives of both Yugoslavia and the Mirdita Republic signed an agreement which stated that the republic would be defended by Yugoslav military forces and the interests of the republic abroad would be represented by the Yugoslav government. This prompted Albania to accuse Yugoslavia of instigating a rebellion and aiding the separatists.

In September 1921, Greek troops conducted military operations in Southern Albania while Yugoslav forces launched ground offensive, destroying over 150 villages, occupying Northern Albania after some clashes with Northern tribesmen and endangered Albania's survival as a state. Albania gained the support of Italy who advised them to engage the rebels and invaders from both a military and diplomatic standpoint. As it was a League of Nations member since 1920, the Albanian government asked the League to recognize Albania's predetermined borders from the Treaty of London in 1913 and finalize any discrepancies. The urgency of the situation became clearer to the League by the end of September, when Albanian and Yugoslav troops stood eye to eye at the demarcation line, with skirmishes in the region of Lurija and Tedrina lasting several weeks and moving the front lines. On 2 October 1921, the Assembly of the League of Nations voted unanimously to let the Great Powers settle the border conflict and recommended Albania to accept beforehand the ramifications of their decision.

== Border war ==
After Yugoslav forces gained the upper hand at the demarcation line by the end of October 1921, a decision was made by the Yugoslav government to invade Albanian territory beyond the areas they had already occupied. In response, the League of Nations dispatched a commission (Conference of Ambassadors) composed of representatives from the United Kingdom, France, Italy and Japan, who on 7 November 1921 ordered the Yugoslav government to cease hostilities against Albania and withdraw all their troops from foreign territory. The British government advised the League of Nations that military actions should be taken against Yugoslavia based upon Article 16 of the League's Covenant and the Conference of Ambassadors suggested sanctions. The Yugoslav government denied all accusations directed at them and did not answer the commissions call to retreat from Albanian soil. In response, the commission announced its decision about Albania's borders to the public on 9 November 1921.

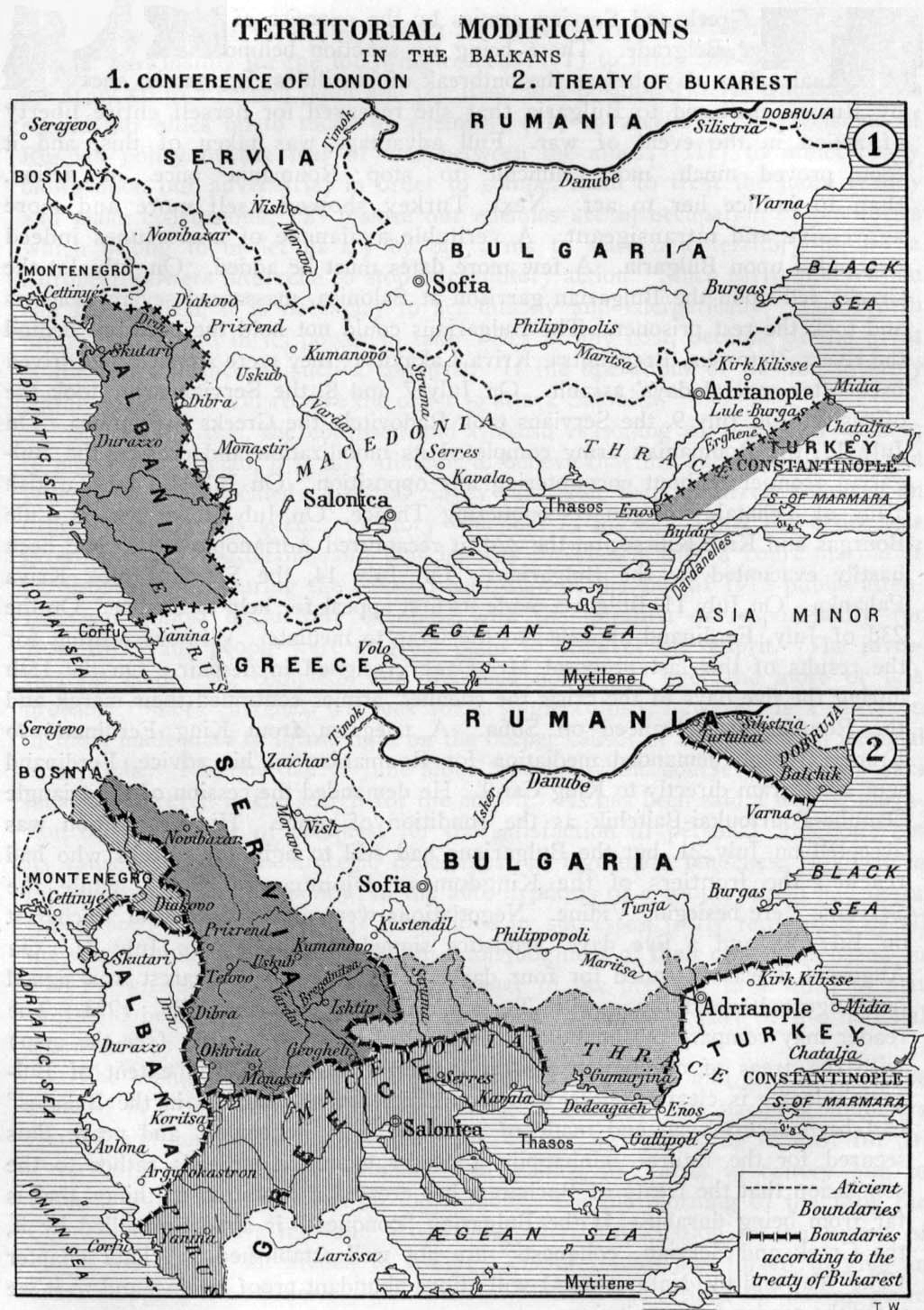
Borders of the Balkan states after the Treaty of London and the Treaty of Bucharest.

The League of Nations confirmed with special resolution the decision of the Conference of Ambassadors from 9 November between 17 November and 19 November 1921. Albania was asked to submit a report to the League about the retreat of Yugoslav, Greek and Albanian troops from the demarcation line and "take necessary security measures" against local movements that endangered the internal peace of Albania. Great Britain's prime minister Lloyd George had recognized the Albanian government that same month and also made multiple heated diplomatic protests against the Yugoslav government, demanding its withdrawal from disputed areas. Due to Britain's intervention and the possibilities of sanctions against their country, Yugoslavia ended support for Gjoni and withdrew its troops from all Albanian territories as stated in the 1913 Treaty of London, albeit under protest.

== Aftermath ==
With the withdrawal of the Yugoslav troops, the Mirdita Republic became quickly overrun by Albanian government troops and irregular forces under the command of Ahmet Zog. The rebellion ended by 20 November 1921 following negotiations with local Mirditor elders who agreed to surrender to Zog if no reprisals would occur. Gjoni fled to Yugoslavia, while Mirdita was placed under siege with Gjoni's followers being proclaimed as traitors. Other rebels were sentenced in a government political court, though no real persecution fell on the main leaders. As a result of the rebellion, Mirditan autonomy was abolished by the Albanian government.

In the meantime, a new Delimitation Commission was formed which would finalize and confirm the official Albanian border, while the United Kingdom insisted on slight adaptations in the region of Debar, Prizren and Kastrati in the interest of Yugoslavia. In an effort to gain the favor of the Border Demarcation Commission, Albania and Yugoslavia established formal diplomatic relations in March 1922, thereby also accepting the League's decision on the matter of Albania's frontiers.
