= List of cities and towns in Albania =

This is a list of cities and towns in Albania categorised by municipality, county and population, according to the criteria used by the Institute of Statistics (INSTAT). As of 2014, there were 74 cities classified as urban areas and 2,972 villages as rural areas in Albania. The legislation of Albania provides no official classification on the criteria of how to define a city or urban area. Furthermore, according to the methodology for cities conducted by the Organisation for Economic Co-operation and Development (OECD), five areas, including Tirana, Durrës, Elbasan, Shkodër and Vlorë, can be classified as urban audit cities. (Note: An 'Urban Audit City' is an area, where at least 50% of the city's population lives in an urban centre as well as where at least 75% of the urban centre's population lives in a city.)

== List ==
Capitals of counties are shown in bold face.

City	Municipality	County	Population (2023)	Geographic coordinates	Ref.
Bajram Curri	Tropojë	Kukës	4,113	42°21′29″N 20°4′33″E	
Bajzë	Malësi e Madhe	Shkodër	4,335	42°16′35″N 19°25′56″E	
Ballsh	Mallakastër	Fier	4,944	40°36′3″N 19°44′11″E	
**Berat**	Berat	Berat	40,665	40°42′24″N 19°57′8″E	
Bilisht	Devoll	Korçë	7,287	40°37′16″N 20°59′17″E	
Bulqizë	Bulqizë	Dibër	7,875	41°29′30″N 20°13′19″E	
Burrel	Mat	Dibër	7,928	41°36′34″N 20°0′44″E	
Cërrik	Cërrik	Elbasan	7,001	41°1′36″N 19°59′21″E	
Çorovodë	Skrapar	Berat	3,918	40°30′15″N 20°13′38″E	
Delvinë	Delvinë	Vlorë	4,952	39°57′17″N 20°5′56″E	
Divjakë	Divjakë	Fier	6,713	40°59′47″N 19°31′57″E	
**Durrës**	Durrës	Durrës	101,728	41°18′40″N 19°26′21″E	
**Elbasan**	Elbasan	Elbasan	66,834	41°6′41″N 20°4′49″E	
Ersekë	Kolonjë	Korçë	2,822	40°20′24″N 20°40′54″E	
**Fier**	Fier	Fier	52,926	40°43′30″N 19°33′26″E	
Fierzë	Tropojë	Kukës	1,149	42°15′47″N 20°1′30″E	
Finiq	Finiq	Vlorë	2,693	39°54′25″N 20°3′32″E	
Fushë-Arrëz	Fushë-Arrëz	Shkodër	2,221	42°3′43″N 20°0′59″E	
Fushë-Krujë	Krujë	Durrës	17,877	41°28′44″N 19°43′14″E	
**Gjirokastër**	Gjirokastër	Gjirokastër	16,569	40°5′0″N 20°8′20″E	
Gramsh	Gramsh	Elbasan	6,786	40°52′10″N 20°11′3″E	
Himarë	Himarë	Vlorë	3,901	40°6′10″N 19°44′44″E	
Kamëz	Kamëz	Tirana	61,739	41°22′54″N 19°45′37″E	
Kavajë	Kavajë	Tirana	15,827	41°11′16″N 19°33′29″E	
Këlcyrë	Këlcyrë	Gjirokastër	2,149	40°18′32″N 20°10′55″E	
Klos	Klos	Dibër	6,344	41°29′58″N 20°5′4″E	
Konispol	Konispol	Vlorë	1,758	39°39′32″N 20°10′53″E	
Koplik	Malësi e Madhe	Shkodër	2,990	42°12′49″N 19°26′11″E	
**Korçë**	Korçë	Korçë	43,254	40°36′57″N 20°46′48″E	
Krastë	Bulqizë	Dibër	1,339	41°29′30″N 20°13′19″E	
Krrabë	Tirana	Tirana	2,023	41°12′58″N 19°58′14″E	
Krujë	Krujë	Durrës	8,921	41°30′50″N 19°47′31″E	
Krumë	Has	Kukës	4,814	42°12′0″N 20°25′0″E	
Kuçovë	Kuçovë	Berat	12,629	40°48′13″N 19°54′52″E	
**Kukës**	Kukës	Kukës	15,643	42°4′52″N 20°25′12″E	
Kurbnesh	Mirditë	Lezhë	358	41°46′48″N 20°4′48″E	
Laç	Kurbin	Lezhë	12,854	41°38′6″N 19°42′46″E	
Leskovik	Kolonjë	Korçë	939	40°09′09″N 20°36′02″E	
**Lezhë**	Lezhë	Lezhë	14,687	41°46′55″N 19°38′40″E	
Libohovë	Libohovë	Gjirokastër	1,599	40°1′52″N 20°15′47″E	
Librazhd	Librazhd	Elbasan	6,787	41°10′46″N 20°18′54″E	
Lushnjë	Lushnjë	Fier	26,036	40°56′34″N 19°42′18″E	
Maliq	Maliq	Korçë	3,668	40°42′30″N 20°42′0″E	
Mamurras	Kurbin	Lezhë	11,442	41°34′39″N 19°41′32″E	
Manëz	Durrës	Durrës	7,185	41°26′0″N 19°35′0″E	
Memaliaj	Memaliaj	Gjirokastër	1,786	40°21′0″N 19°59′0″E	
Milot	Kurbin	Lezhë	6,193	41°41′1″N 19°42′57″E	
Orikum	Vlorë	Vlorë	4,297	40°20′0″N 19°28′0″E	
Patos	Patos	Fier	12,255	40°41′0″N 19°37′10″E	
Peqin	Peqin	Elbasan	4,753	41°2′46″N 19°45′4″E	
Përmet	Përmet	Gjirokastër	4,809	40°14′1″N 20°21′6″E	
**Peshkopi**	Dibër	Dibër	14,710	41°41′10″N 20°25′44″E	
Pogradec	Pogradec	Korçë	17,371	40°54′25″N 20°38′53″E	
Poliçan	Poliçan	Berat	3,492	40°36′36″N 20°5′56″E	
Prrenjas	Prrenjas	Elbasan	5,049	41°4′0″N 20°33′0″E	
Pukë	Pukë	Shkodër	2,508	42°2′40″N 19°53′59″E	
Reps	Mirditë	Lezhë	900	41°51′58″N 20°1′33″E	
Roskovec	Roskovec	Fier	4,078	40°44′16″N 19°42′10″E	
Rrëshen	Mirditë	Lezhë	6,773	41°46′3″N 19°52′32″E	
Rrogozhinë	Rrogozhinë	Tirana	5,002	41°4′35″N 19°39′55″E	
Rubik	Mirditë	Lezhë	2,550	41°46′28″N 19°47′10″E	
Sarandë	Sarandë	Vlorë	19,882	39°52′33″N 20°0′40″E	
Selenicë	Selenicë	Vlorë	1,384	40°31′50″N 19°38′9″E	
Shëngjin	Lezhë	Lezhë	6,963	41°48′49″N 19°35′38″E	
Shijak	Durrës	Durrës	5,832	41°20′44″N 19°34′1″E	
**Shkodër**	Shkodër	Shkodër	61,633	42°4′5″N 19°30′43″E	
Sukth	Durrës	Durrës	13,395	41°22′42″N 19°32′9″E	
Tepelenë	Tepelenë	Gjirokastër	3,709	40°17′44″N 20°1′8″E	
**Tirana**	Tirana	Tirana	389,323	41°19′39″N 19°49′6″E	
Ulëz	Mat	Dibër	661	41°41′0″N 19°53′4″E	
Ura Vajgurore	Ura Vajgurore	Berat	7,209	40°46′30″N 19°52′30″E	
Vau i Dejës	Vau i Dejës	Shkodër	5,710	42°0′0″N 19°38′0″E	
**Vlorë**	Vlorë	Vlorë	66,320	40°28′14″N 19°29′27″E	
Vorë	Vorë	Tirana	8,969	41°23′38″N 19°39′16″E	

== Gallery ==
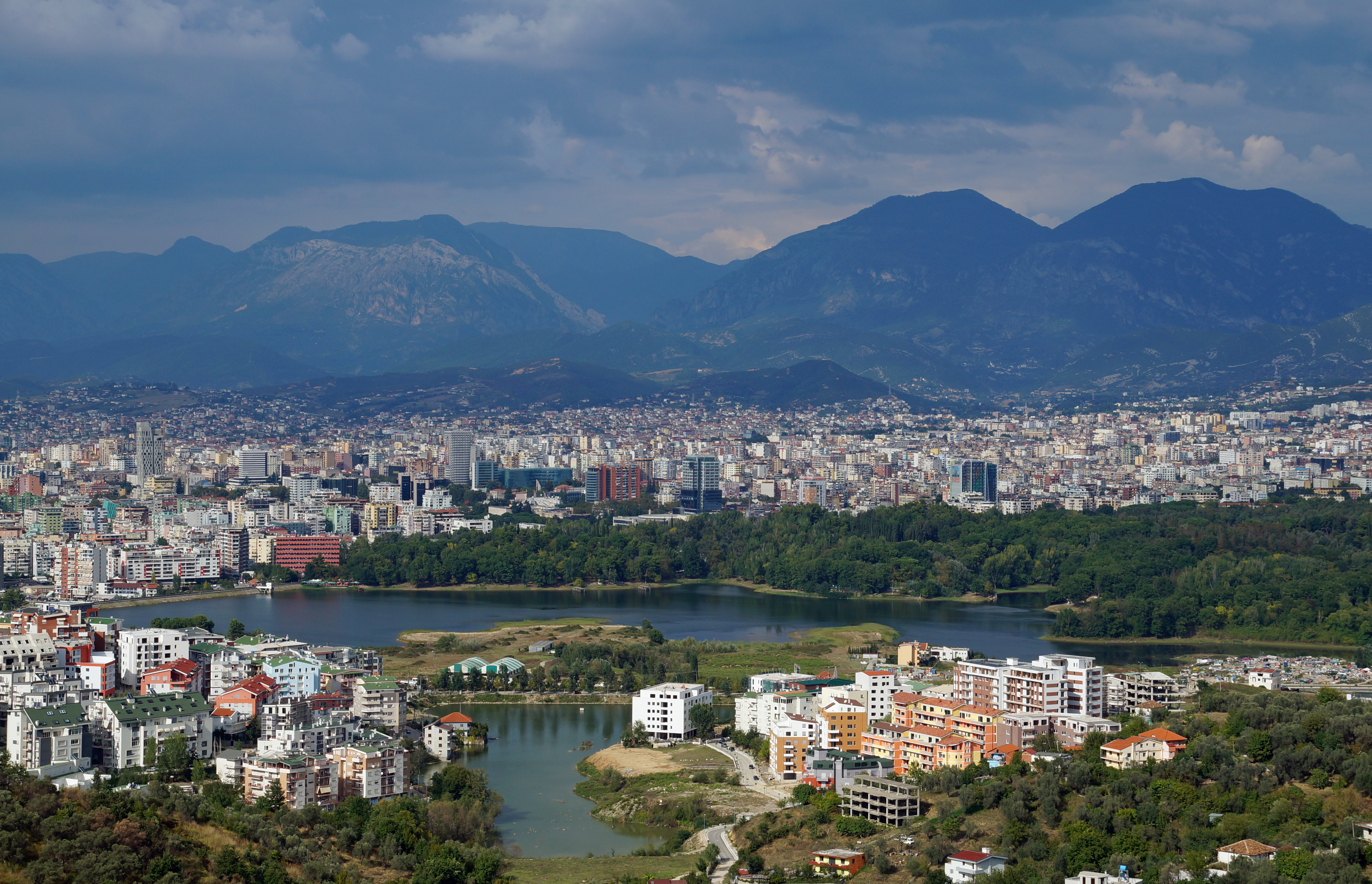
1. Tirana

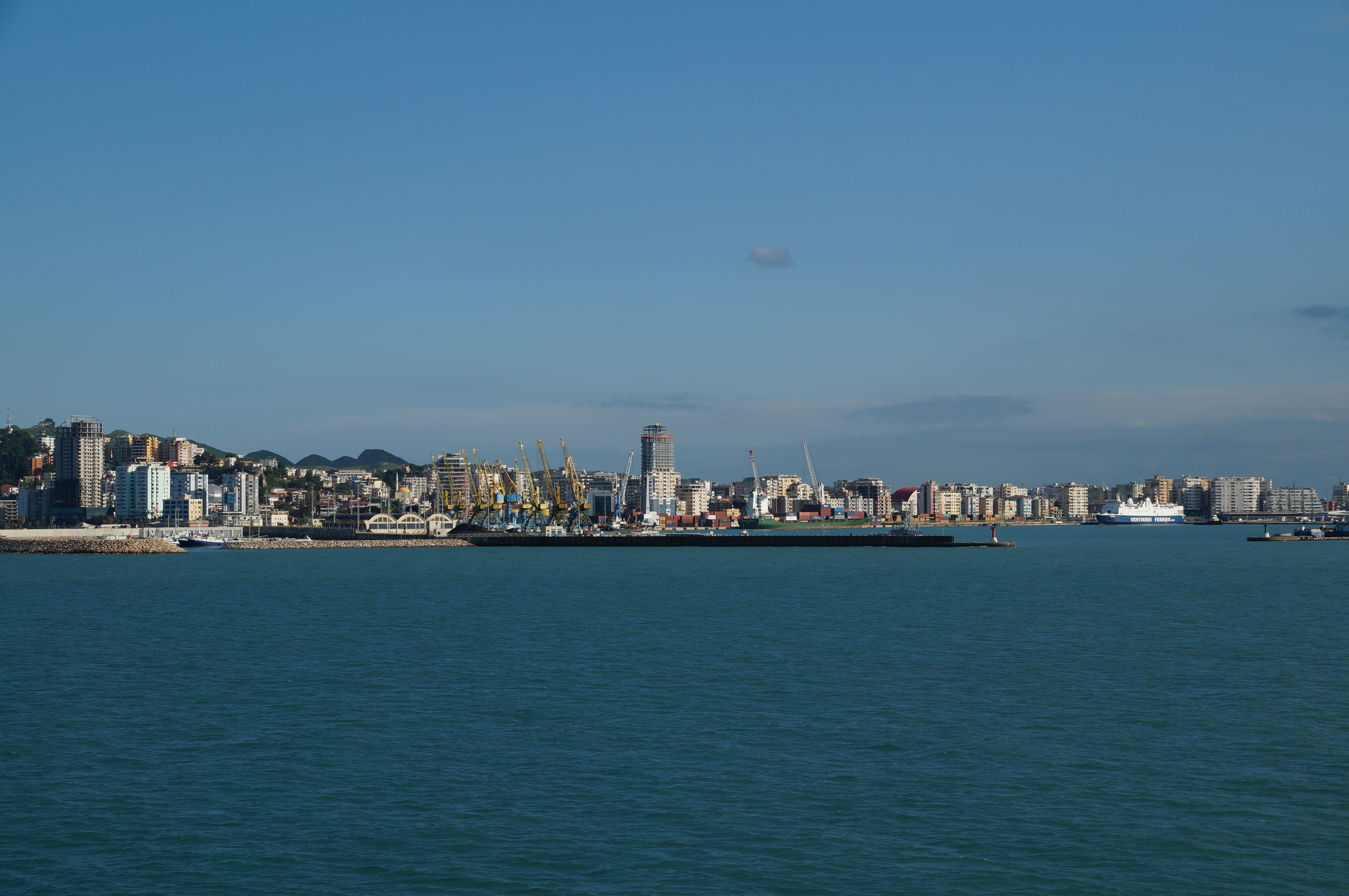
2. Durrës

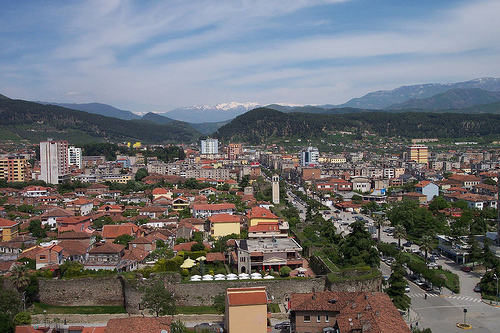
3. Elbasan

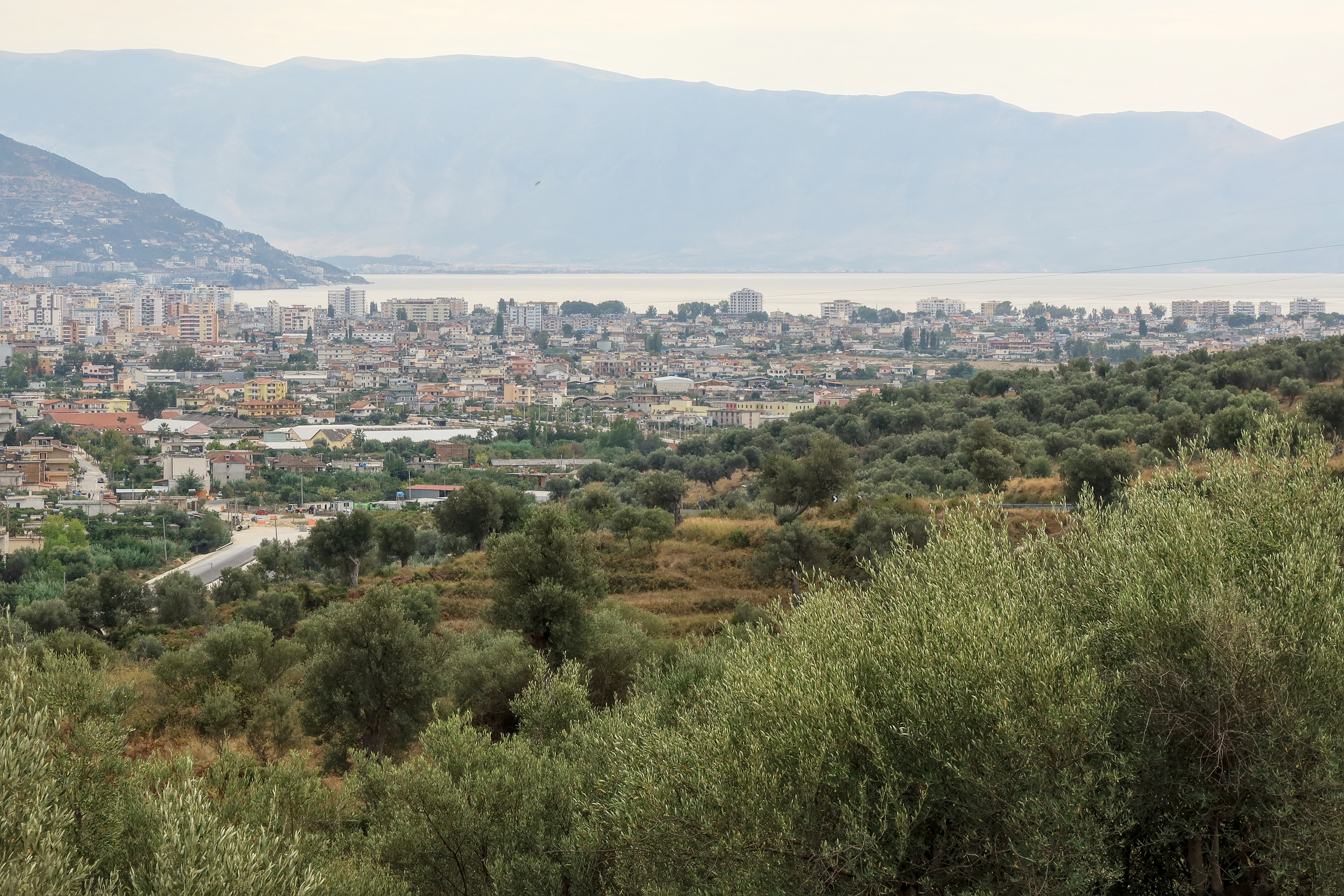
4. Vlorë

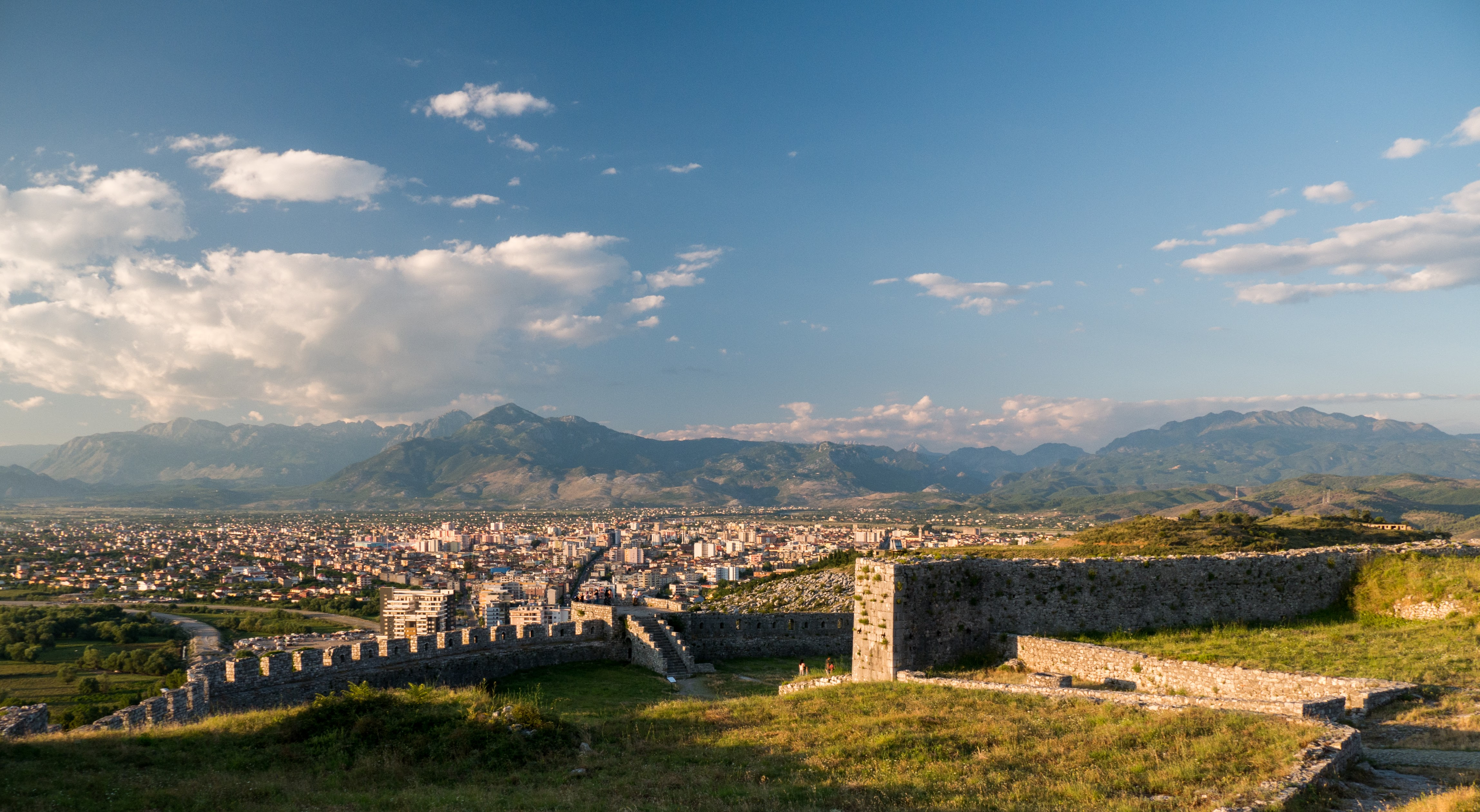
6. Shkodër

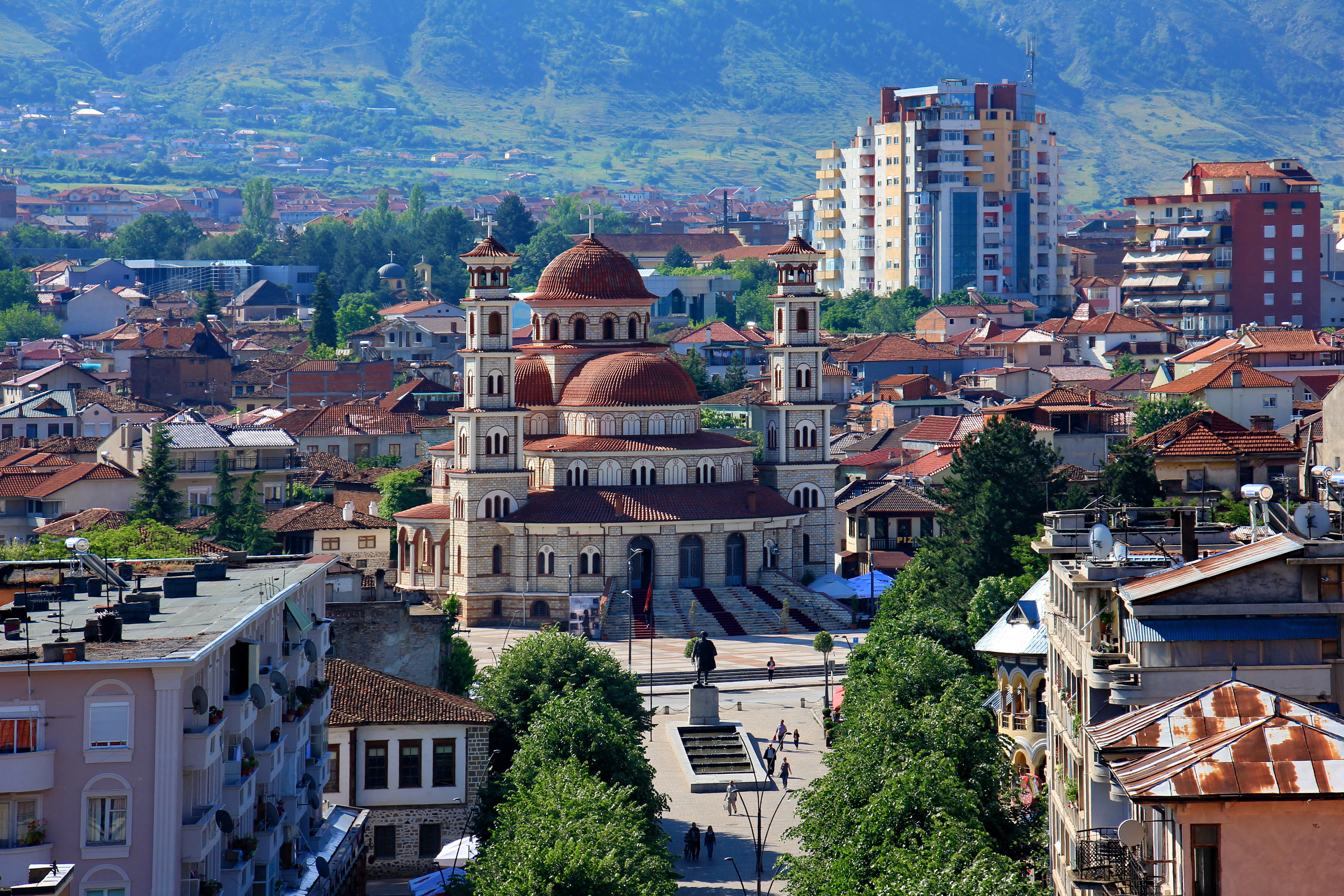
8. Korçë

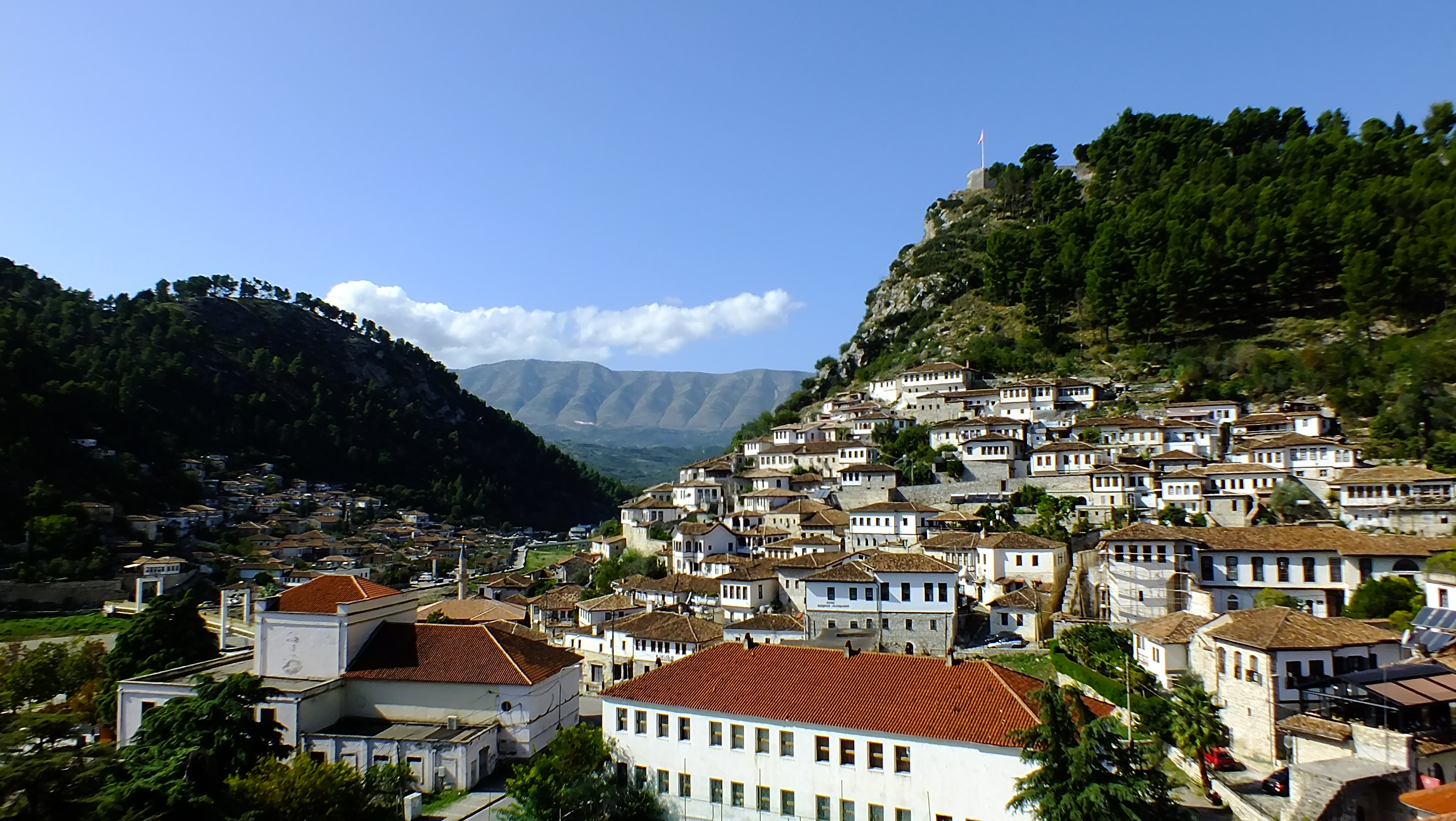
9. Berat

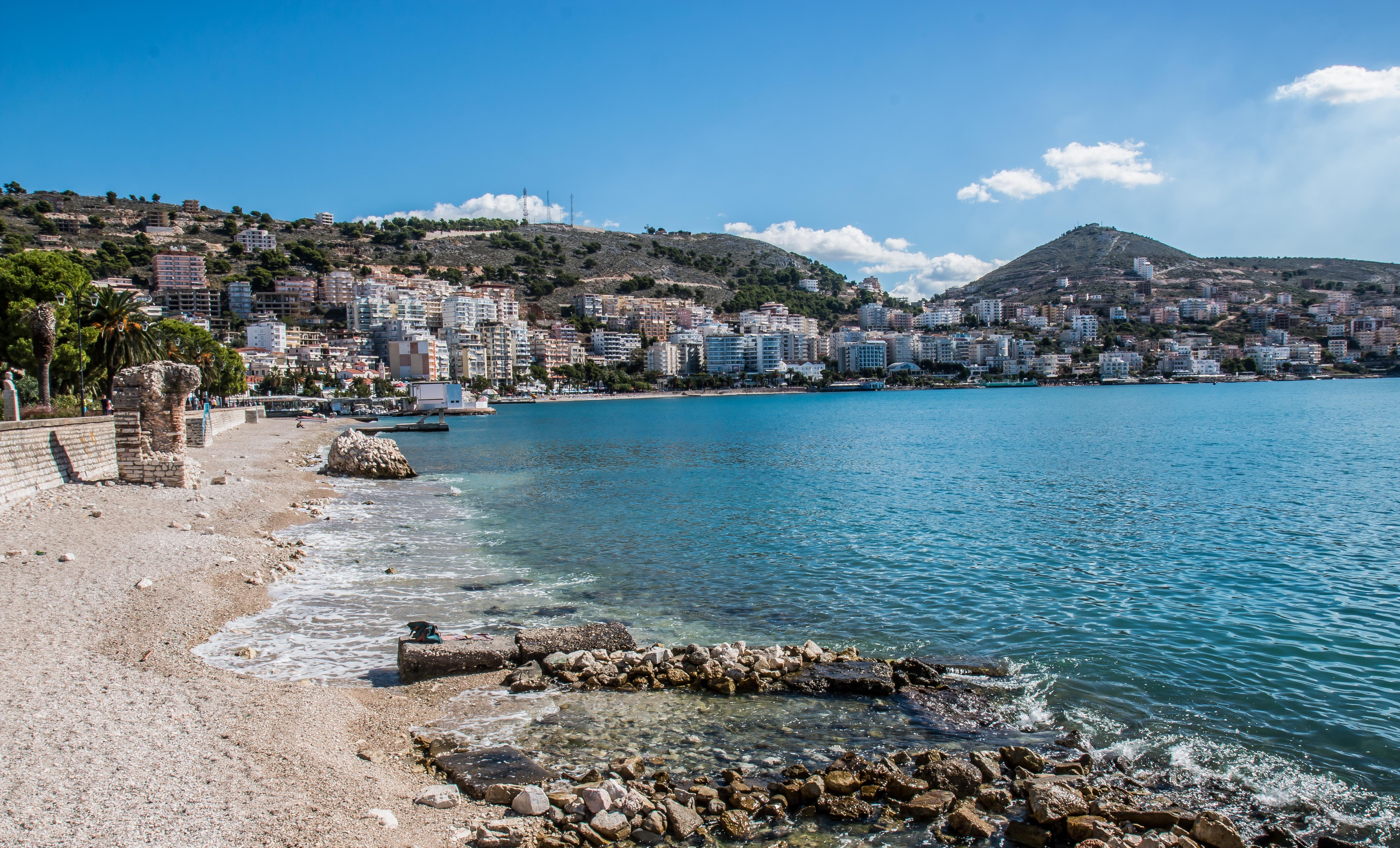
11. Sarandë

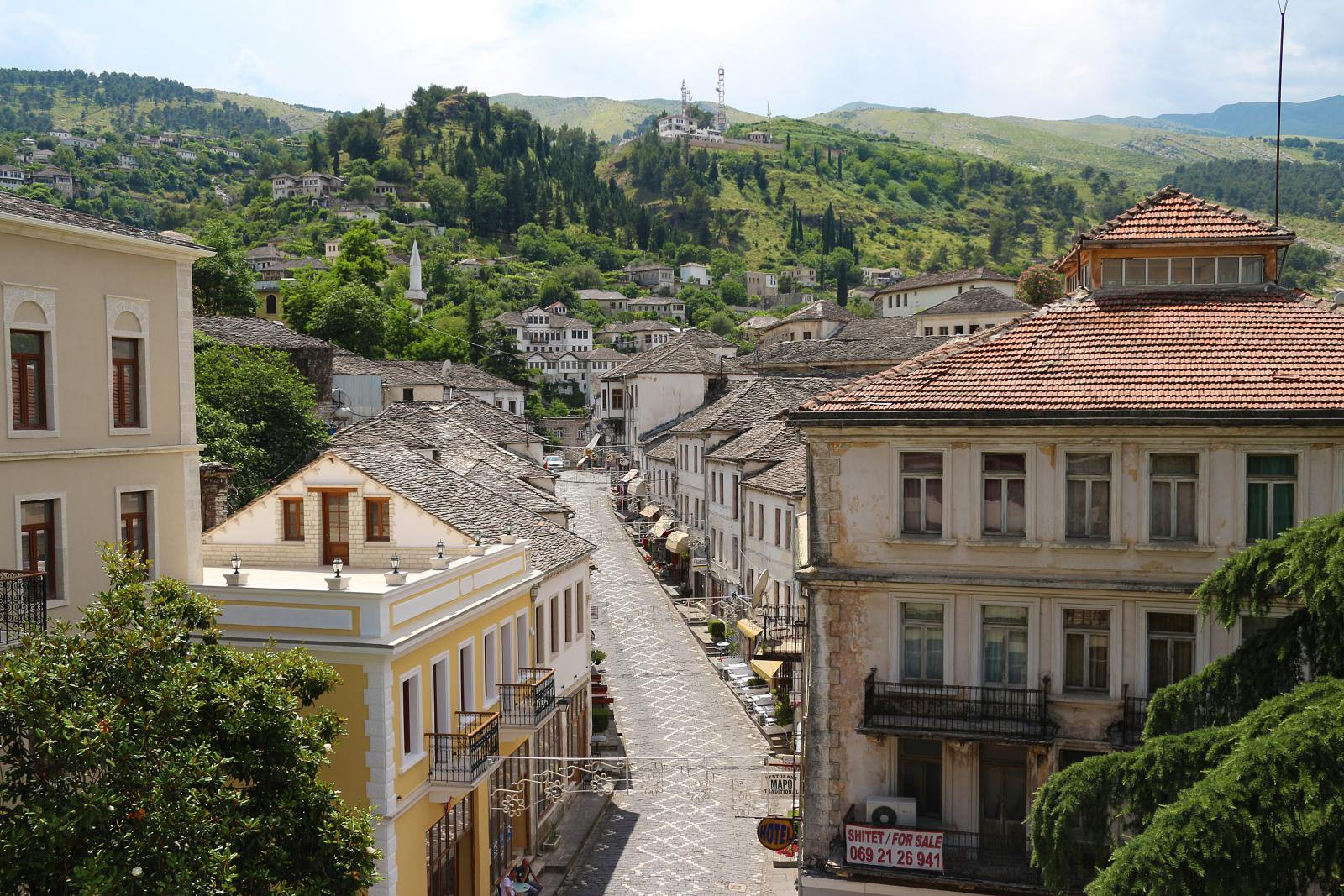
14. Gjirokastër
