= Kurbnesh =

Village in central Albania

- Town
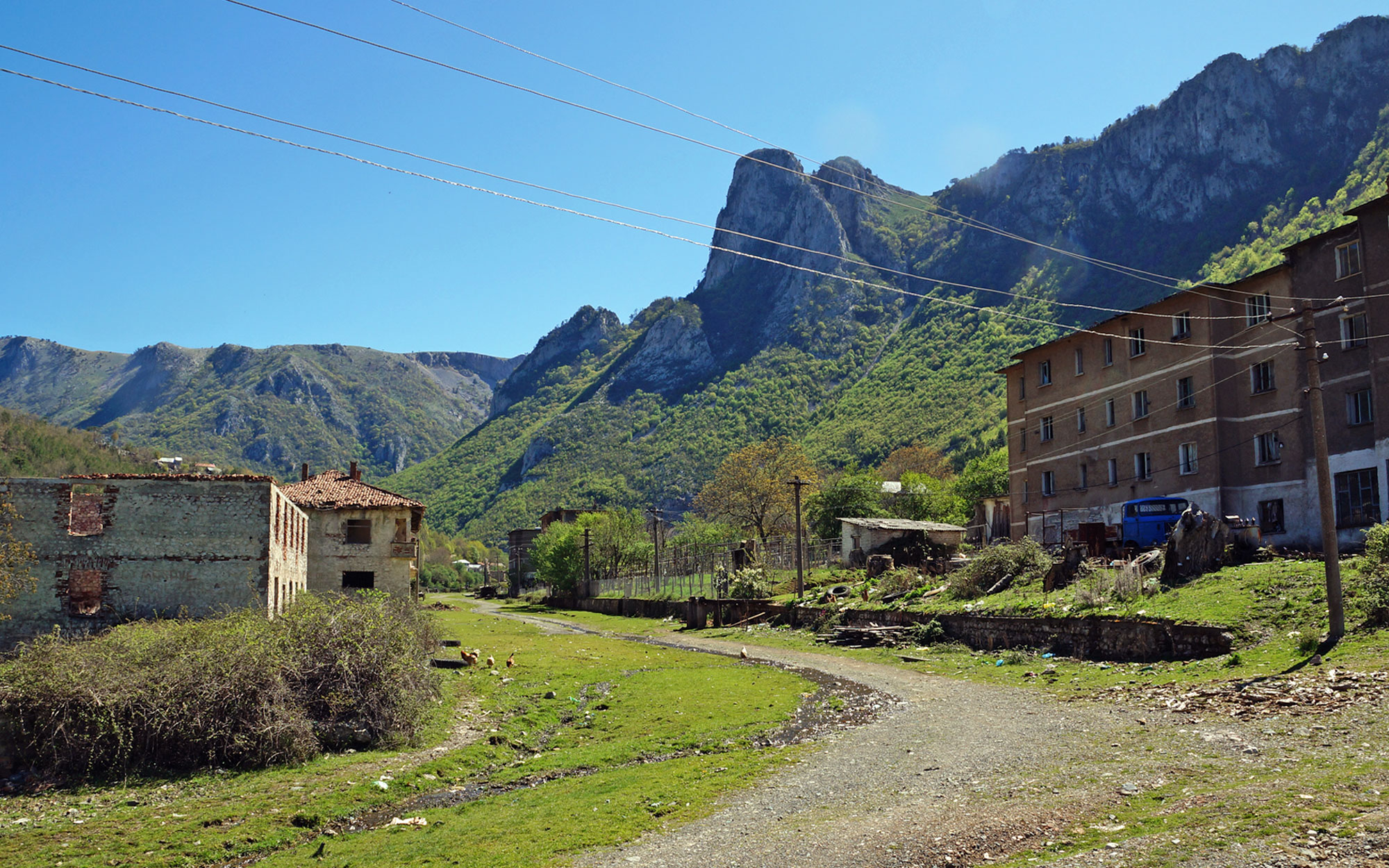
- Kurbnesh in 2016, with the Maja e Gurit Gjon mountain visible in the background.

- Location within Albania
- Coordinates: 41.78°N 20.08°E
- Country: Albania
- County: Lezhë
- Municipality: Mirditë
- Administrative unit: Selitë

Population (2023)
  - Total: 358
- Time zone: UTC+1 (CET)
  - Summer (DST): UTC+2 (CEST)

Kurbnesh is a small town in the municipality of Mirditë, in Lezhë County, Albania. As of 2023, Kurbnesh had a population of 358 people.

== History ==
Kurbnesh was founded as a mining community sometime in the late 1950s and early 1960s. During this period, mining and copper processing were being established as Mirditë's primary form of economic activity. Mining specialists from East Germany were hired to oversee the development of local mining operations.

In 1976, British traveller Leslie Gardiner wrote noted that Kurbnesh was dimly lit with few street lamps.
