= Reps =

- Town
- Location within Albania
- Coordinates: 41°51′58″N 20°1′33″E
- Country: Albania
- County: Lezhë
- Municipality: Mirditë
- Administrative unit: Orosh
- Time zone: UTC+1 (CET)
  - Summer (DST): UTC+2 (CEST)

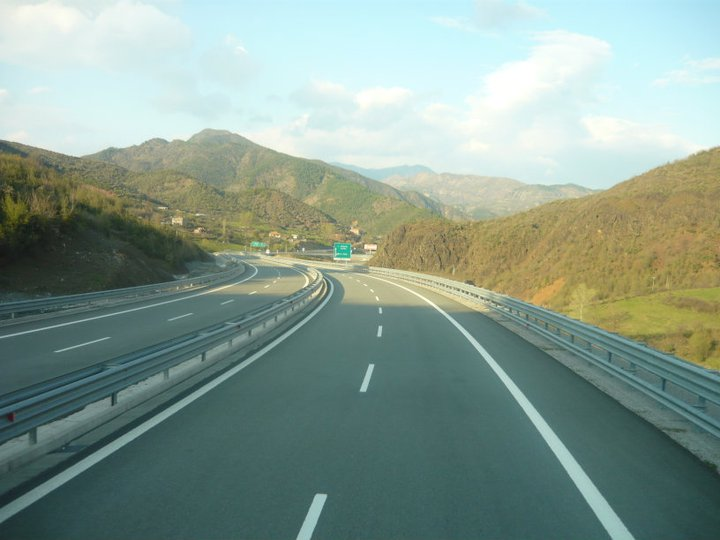
A1 motorway near Reps.

Reps is a small town in the Lezhë County, northwestern Albania. At the 2015 local government reform it became part of the municipality Mirditë. It was the seat of the former municipality Orosh. The Vandrushen chromium mines are 4 km outside the village centre.
