= Perlat =

- Village
- Location within Albania
- Coordinates: 41°43′51″N 19°58′4″E
- Country: Albania
- County: Lezhë
- Municipality: Mirditë
- Administrative unit: Kthellë
- Time zone: UTC+1 (CET)
  - Summer (DST): UTC+2 (CEST)

Perlat is a village in the former municipality of Kthellë in the Lezhë County, northwestern Albania. At the 2015 local government reform it became part of the municipality Mirditë. The village is the largest in the former municipality.

== Notable people ==
- Pjetër Perlati, commander of the League of Lezhë
