= Selitë, Mirditë =

Selitë
- Administrative unit
- Location within Albania
- Coordinates: 41°47′N 20°5′E
- Country: Albania
- County: Lezhë
- Municipality: Mirditë

Population (2023)
  - Administrative unit: 358
- Time zone: UTC+1 (CET)
  - Summer (DST): UTC+2 (CEST)

Selitë is a former municipality in the Lezhë County, northwestern Albania. At the 2015 local government reform it became a subdivision of the municipality Mirditë. The population at the 2023 census was 358.

The settlement holding town status is Kurbnesh. The municipal unit was once part of the Oher district, but this district was divided between Mati and Mirdita.

== Demographic history ==
Selitë is recorded in the Ottoman defter of 1467 as a hass-ı mir-liva property in the vilayet of Uraka. The village had a total of 16 households which were represented by the following household heads: Progon Bardhi, Petër Dajçi, Lazar Stepani, Peter Skura, Kal Gjirgj Gjika, Lika Gurbanëshi, Manko Gurbanëshi, Gjon Mirdidi, Lika Miljoti, Pal Luka, Gjon Dajçi, Peter Luka, Gjon Karusi, Lazar Gjika, Andrija Luzi, and Mati.
