= Rubik Monastery Church =

12th-century church in Albania

- Kisha e T'Shëlbuemit Rubikut (Albanian)
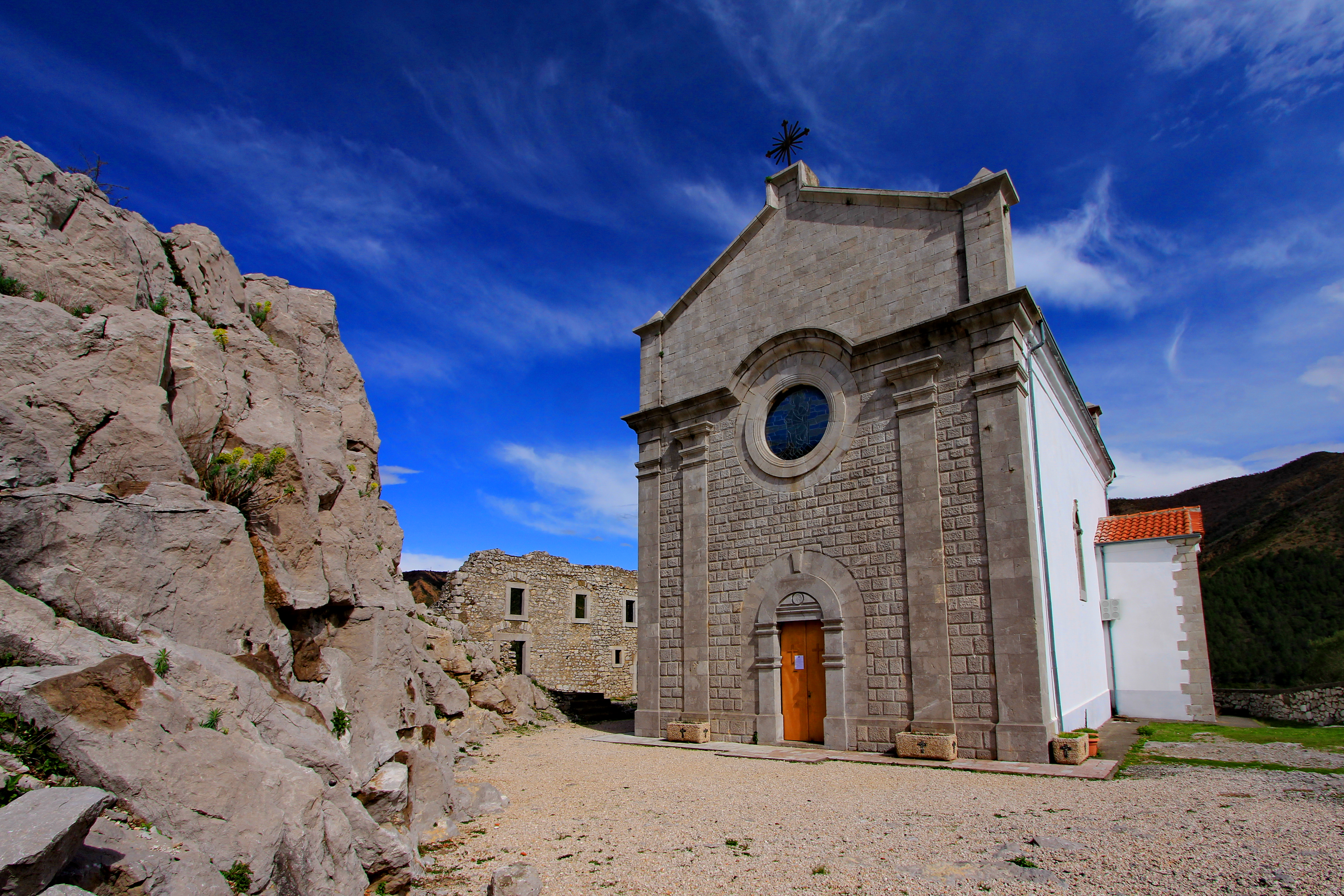
- Front of church
- Interactive map of Rubik Monastery Church
- 41.7652°N 19.7807°E
- Location: Rubik

History
- Built: 1166 AD, 12th Century

Cultural Monument of Albania

The Rubik Monastery Church (Albanian: Kisha e T'Shëlbuemit Rubik) is a monastery church in Rubik, Lezhë County, Albania. It is a Cultural Monument of Albania. It was built in 1166 AD.

== History and background ==
The Church of Rubik, is one of the icons of Albanian Christianity with an important historical background.

The Medieval Benedictine monastery is located in a very strategic location, on a prominent rocky plot of a natural bend of the Fan (river), above the small Albanian town of Rubik. The water route that, using the river, connected the coast with Arbanon up to the heights of Oroshi, and the land route that is referred to as l'Itinerarium Lissus-Naissus.

The monastery was built as one of four Benedictine Conventions in Mirdita, a city in Albania.

Historiography has recognised the monastery’s abbey as well as the parish church with the same name. Formerly Franciscan, in the city of Rubik and in the district of Lezha, as well as historically part of this diocese, today it is included in the bishopric of Rrëshen. The Church of Redemption, from 1166 to 1972, is mentioned 34 times.

From the end of the 19th century to the first years of this millennium, renovations have completely changed the original appearance of the building. On the other hand, these transformations allow the distinction of the few surviving medieval phases integrated into the new building. The frescoes unfold in the interior only in this surviving part which is the eastern face and which dates back to 1272 with an inscription. But before that year, other events had defined the history of the building. The bishop of Lezha wrote in 1629 in the report of his visit, where he cited an inscription on the church door from the year 1267.

The monastery was declared as a cultural monument of Albania on the 23rd September 1971.

Frescoes and murals from the church
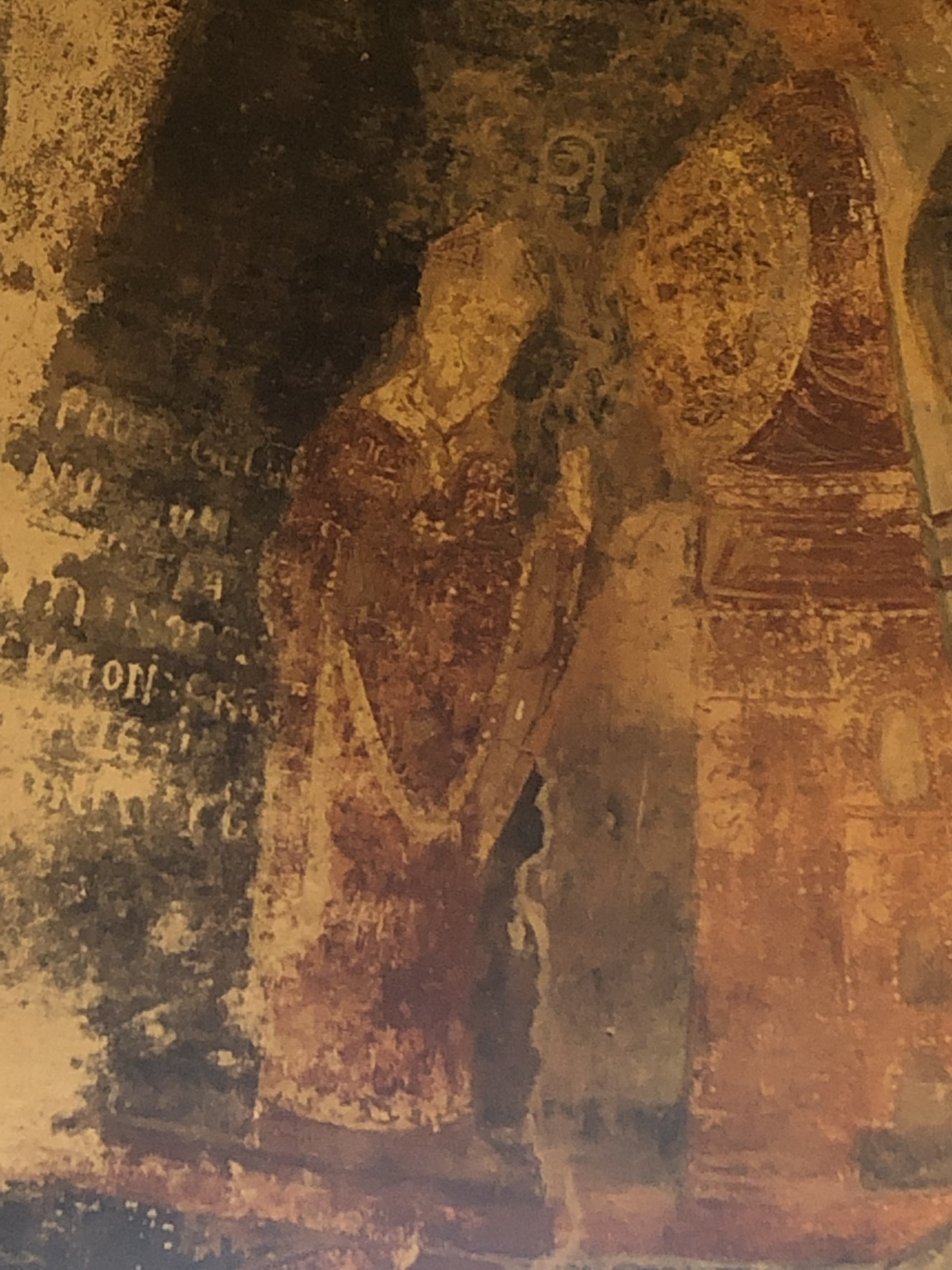
Fresco

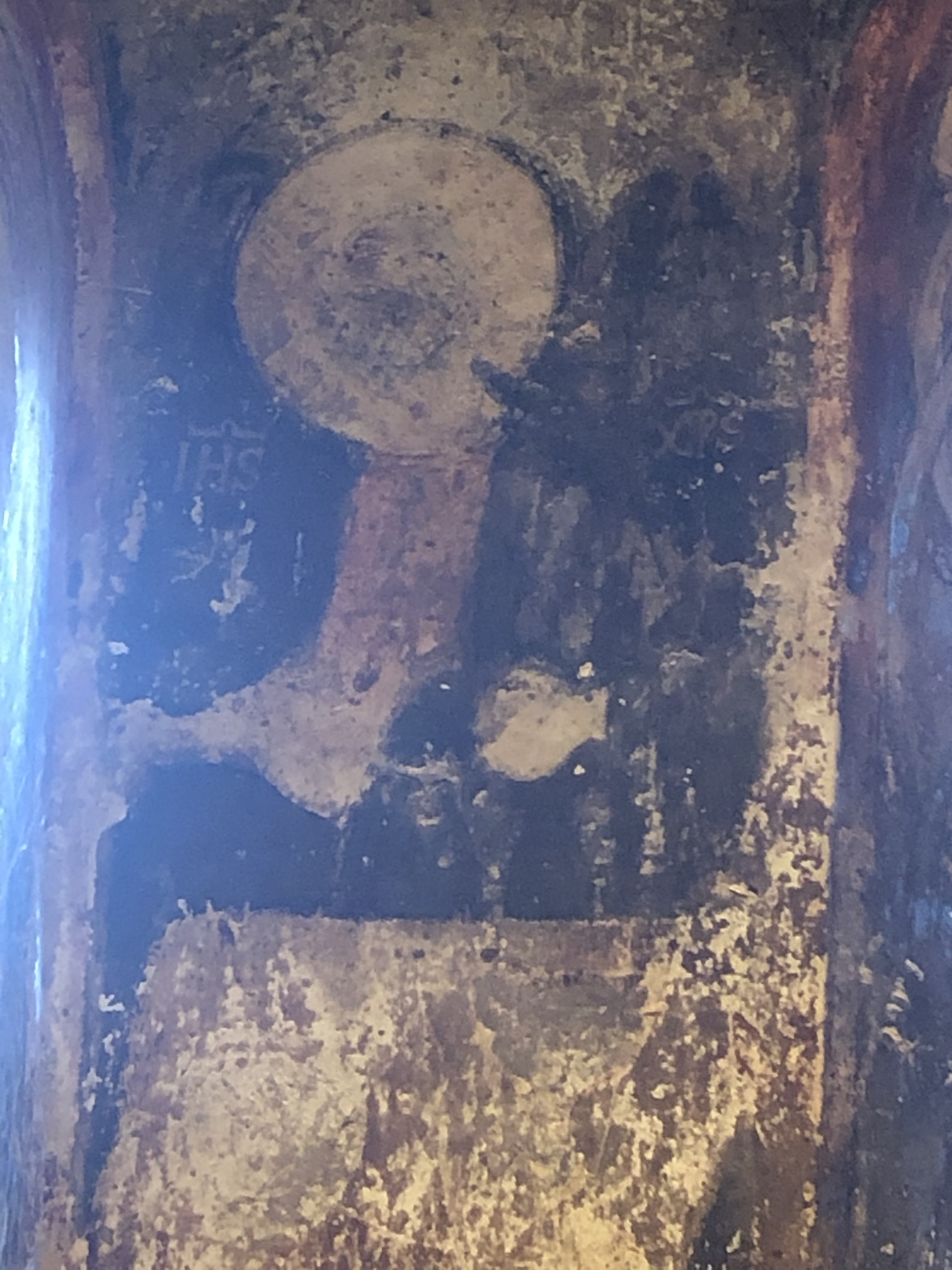
Fresco

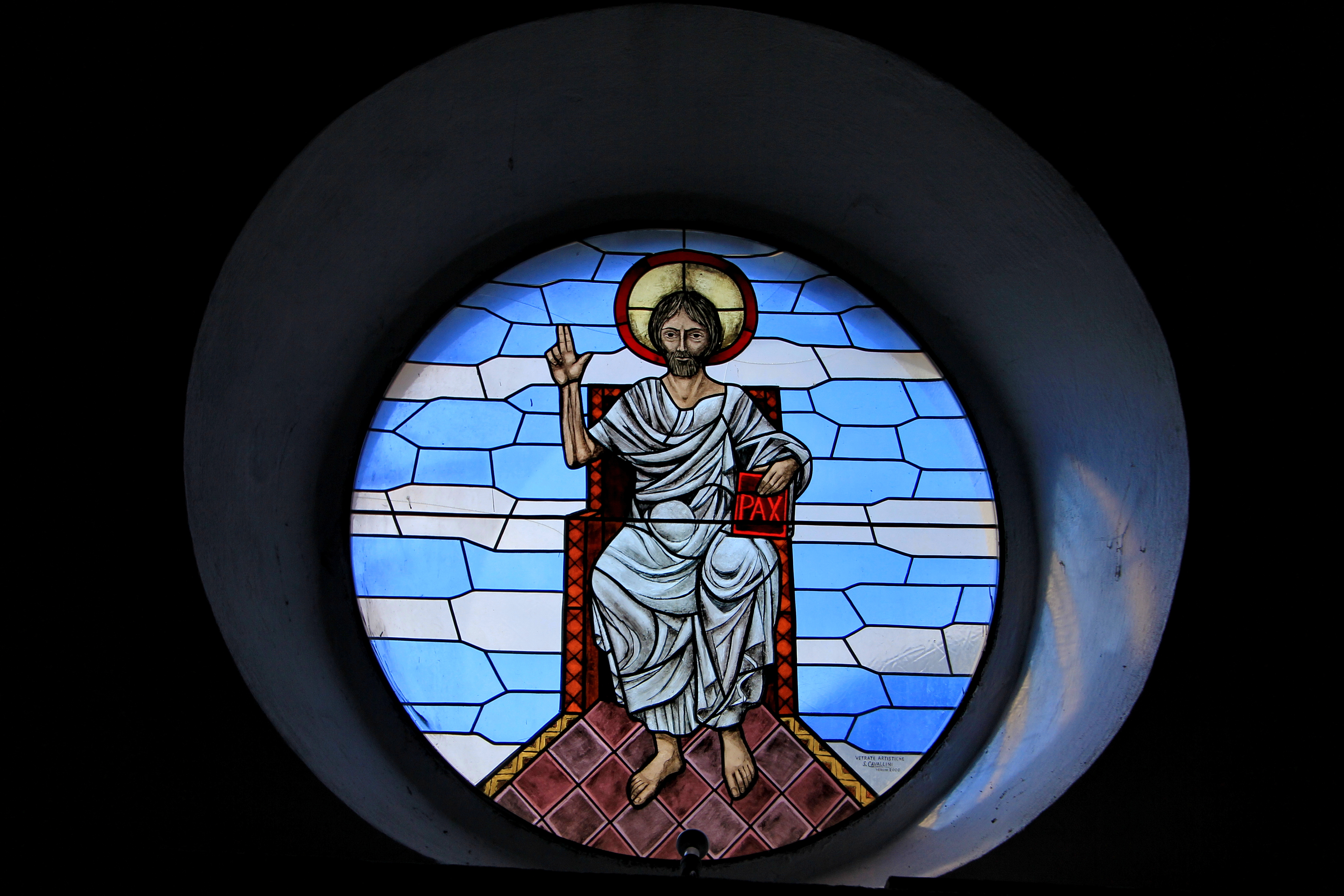
Stain-glass window

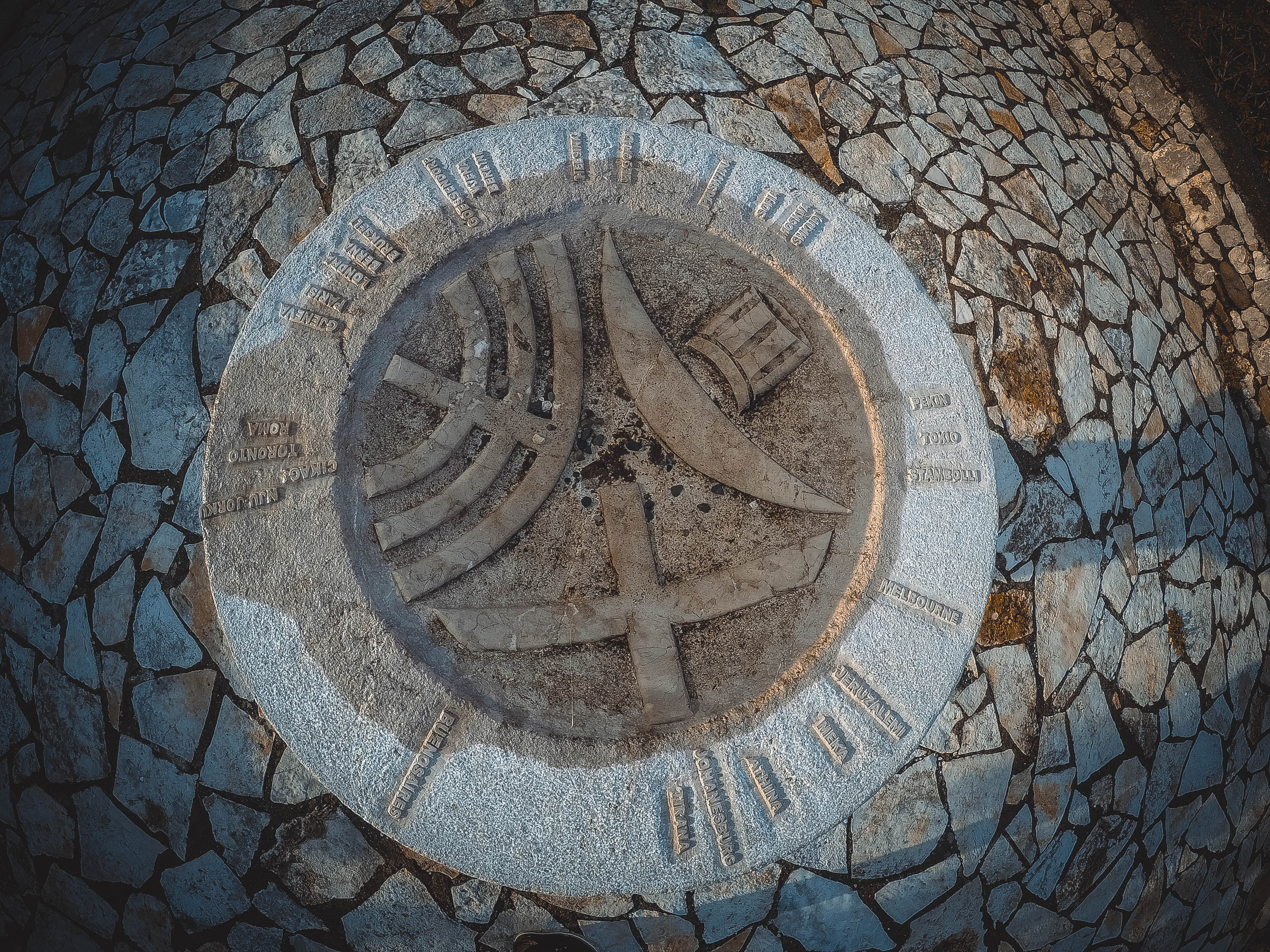
