= Kthellë =

- Administrative unit
- Location within Albania
- Coordinates: 41°44′N 19°58′E
- Country: Albania
- County: Lezhë
- Municipality: Mirditë

Population (2023)
  - Total: 1,202
- Time zone: UTC+1 (CET)
  - Summer (DST): UTC+2 (CEST)

Kthellë is a former municipality in the Lezhë County, northwestern Albania. At the 2015 local government reform it became a subdivision of the municipality Mirditë. The population at the 2023 census was 1,202. It encompasses the villages of Perlat Qendër, Perlat i Sipërm, Shebe, Tharr, Trojë, Prosek, Rrushkull, Ujë and Shtrezë.

The largest village in the municipal unit is Perlat. It was once in the center of the old Oheri district of early 20th century Albania, but this district was later divided between Mirdita and Mati.

Since 2015, Kthellë forms part of the new Kthella Regional Nature Park adjacent to the Oroshi Mt Protected Area.

== Etymology ==
The name comes from the Gheg word "thkellë", dialectal form of the standard Albanian word "thellë", meaning "deep". Local oral traditions hold that the region was exclusively referred to as Thkellë until the late 19th century, before being used interchangeably with Kthellë, though the latter superseded it sometime around the mid-20th century. The switching of th and k is a phenomenon present in the everyday speech of Gheg Albanian.

== Notable people ==
- Pjetër Perlati, commander of the League of Lezhë
