= Rubik (town) =

Town in central Albania

- Administrative unit
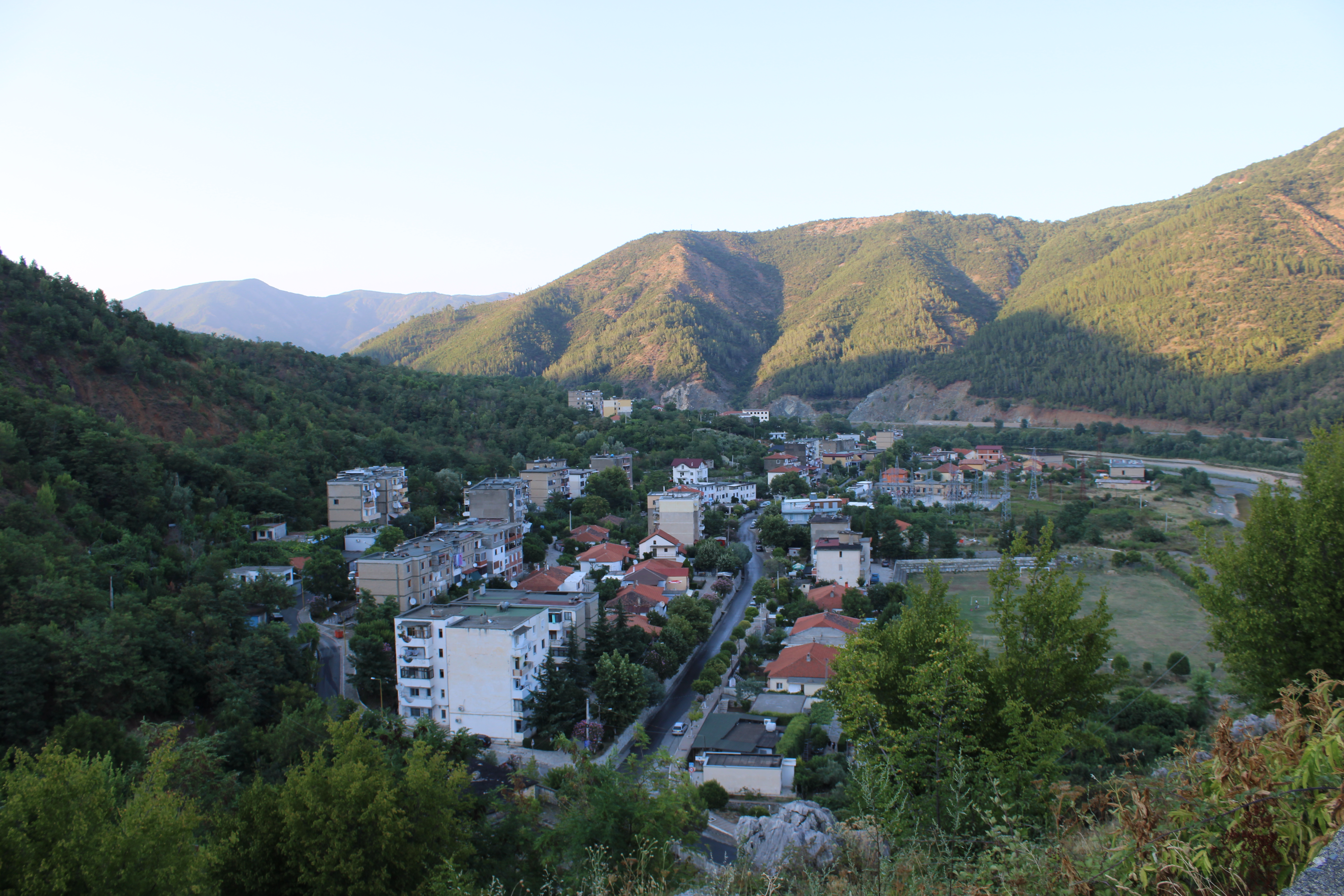

- Emblem

- Location within Albania
- Coordinates: 41°46′N 19°47′E
- Country: Albania
- County: Lezhë
- Municipality: Mirditë
  - Administrative unit: 140.5 km^{2} (54.2 sq mi)
- Elevation: 77 m (253 ft)

Population (2023)
  - Administrative unit: 2,550
  - Administrative unit density: 18.1/km^{2} (47.0/sq mi)
- Time zone: UTC+1 (CET)
  - Summer (DST): UTC+2 (CEST)
- Postal Code: 4603
- Area Code: 0284

Rubik is a town in northern Albania. It lies along national highway SH30. At the 2015 local government reform it became a subdivision of the municipality Mirditë. The population at the 2023 census was 2,550.

The municipal unit consists of the town of Rubik at its center and eleven peripheral villages: Fang, Katund i Vjeter, Bulshizë, Rasfik, Fierzë, Munaz, Rreja e Velës, Livadhëza, Vau Shkjezë, Rrethi i Eperm, Bulgër, and Rreja e Zezë. It holds the site of the Rubik Monastery Church, built in the 12th century AD.

== Demographics ==
According to 2006 data, 2277 families or 8094 people reside in Rubik Municipality's jurisdiction. Of those 2277 families, about 1070 reside in the central town of Rubik which constitutes about 3736 people. The remaining 53% of the population, or 1207 families with 4358 people, inhabit the eleven villages within Rubik Municipality's administrative area. All the families of Rubik are ethnically Albanian and speak in the Gheg dialect of the Albanian language.

== Culture ==
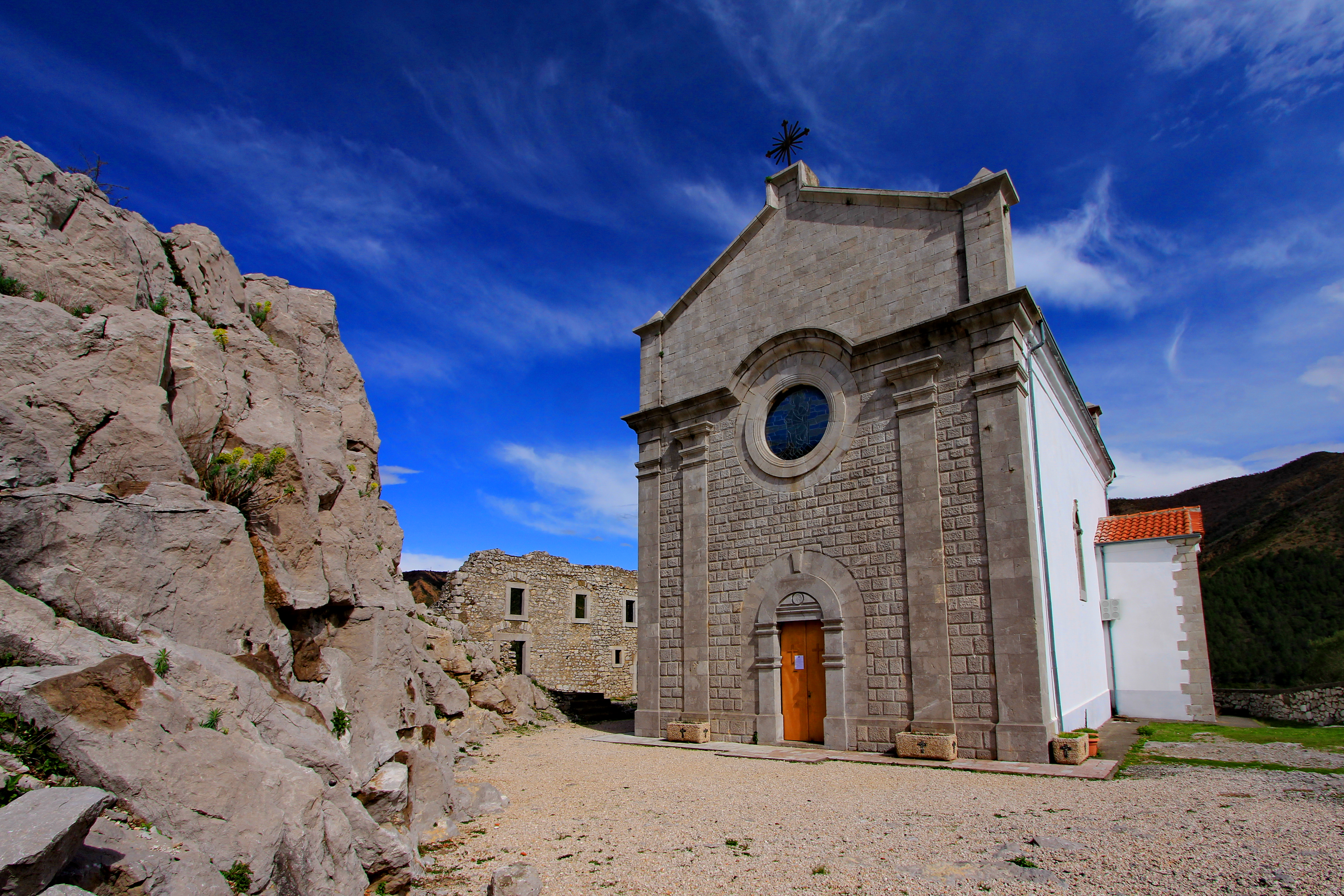
Church of Rubik

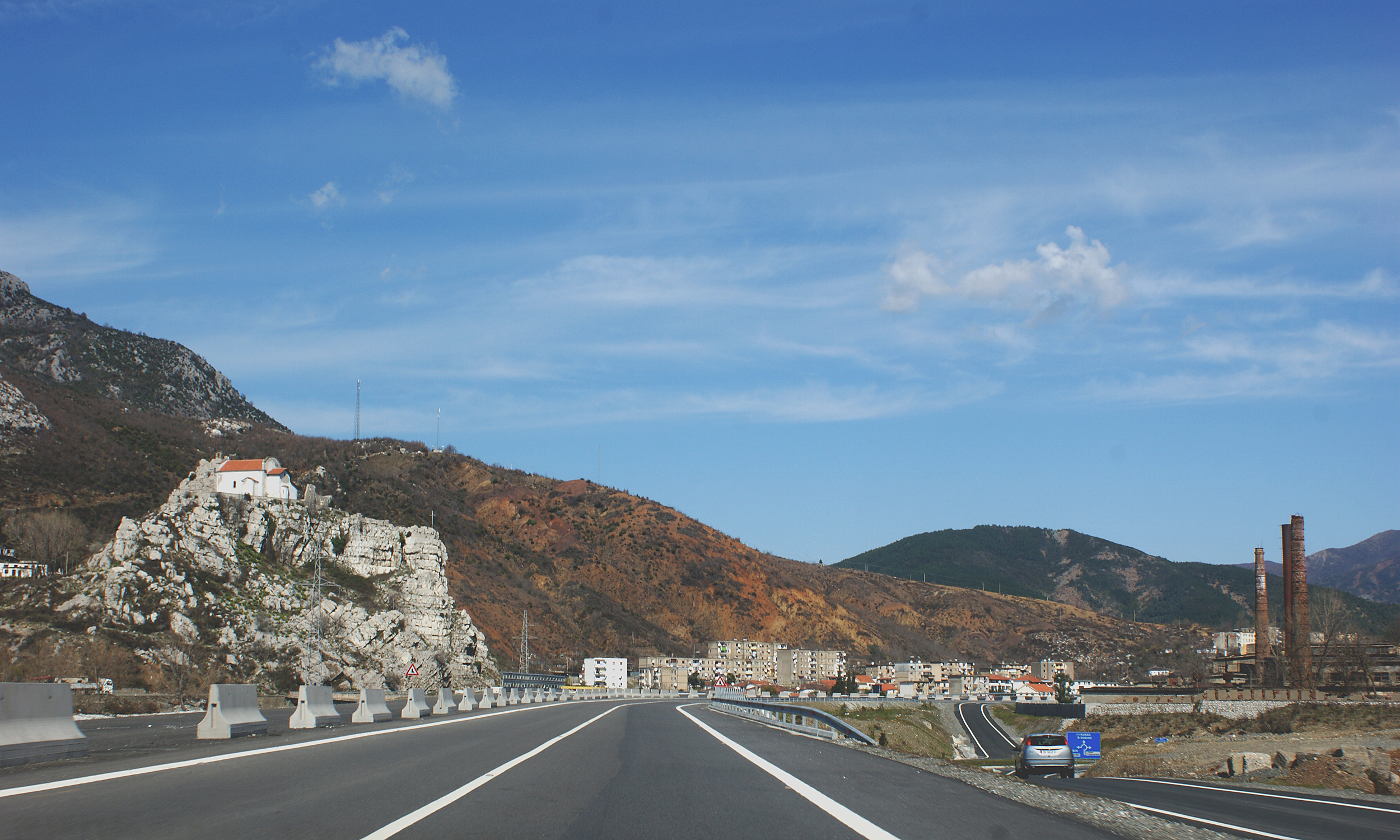
Rubik and its church seen from the Albania-Kosovo Highway A1

Rubik Monastery Church is the first building in Rubik that a traveler will notice as they drive along the Fan River. Towering over the small community of Rubik, the Franciscan monastery sits a top a white cliff as if observing the daily activities of the city. Originally established in 1166 as one of four Benedictine Conventions in the Mirdita region of present day Albania, the church represents the ascension of Jesus Christ following his 40-day return after Easter. The Benedictines of Rubik later delivered the Church to the Franciscan Order in Albania sometime around the year 1217 due to destruction of many lands and churches by Vandal Turkish Armies. Only five Franciscan conventions survived the Turkish raids of the time: that of Sebaste (Kurbin), Lezhe, Rubik, Mamli, and Bishti i Muzhlit (Durrës), which had more than 40 friars in total. The Franciscans who refused to accept the catastrophes the order had experienced established seven hospices (special housing for sheltering missionaries) the second of which was established in Rubik in the 16th century and was responsible for the populations of Fan, Kthelle, Selite, Lure, and Cidhen.

Throughout the 17th century the Franciscans of Rubik were active in a very large geographical region that incorporated a wide network of missionaries. Complete restoration of the area was carried out in the 19th century through opening of many religious institutions and reorganization of many churches with two main centers: the Franciscan Convention of Trashan in 1882 and the Franciscan Convention of Novitiate, (located in Rubik) in 1898. As centers of theology and philosophy, conventions were at the same time important educational centers where Greek-Roman literature and philosophy were taught. The religious complex, consisting of the Church, parish Cell, Bell Tower, hospices, and College, were built with a unique architecture and graphic artistic presentation (frescoes) that was almost completely destroyed by Communist leadership in 1967 during the dictatorship of Enver Hoxha. In order to dissuade alignment to any other organization other than the Party of Labour, the last Franciscan Father Leon Kabashi was banished and a majority of the Church properties were destroyed including frescoes, the library, archive, relics, and most of the Church and Hospice walls.

Following the fall of communism in Albania and the rise of a Democratic state, national cultural monuments are beginning to experience restoration and protection. The Catholic Church in collaboration with the Albanian government has restored the walls of the Church of Ascension in Rubik and the frescoes are currently being restored in Italy. Although the Church was not restored to its original architectural state, the Municipality of Rubik is currently in the planning process of removing the new walls where original stone reside and restoring the Church to a more historically correct state.

In recent years, many emigres are returning home and have started building hotels and restaurants featuring local tradition and specialties. The village of Katund i Vjeter is slowly becoming an important tourist destination in Rubik, and Mirdite region in general.

=== Sports ===
The city's favorite sport is football. Its main football team is KF Mirdita and is playing in the Albanian Third Division.
