= Mirditë =

- Municipality
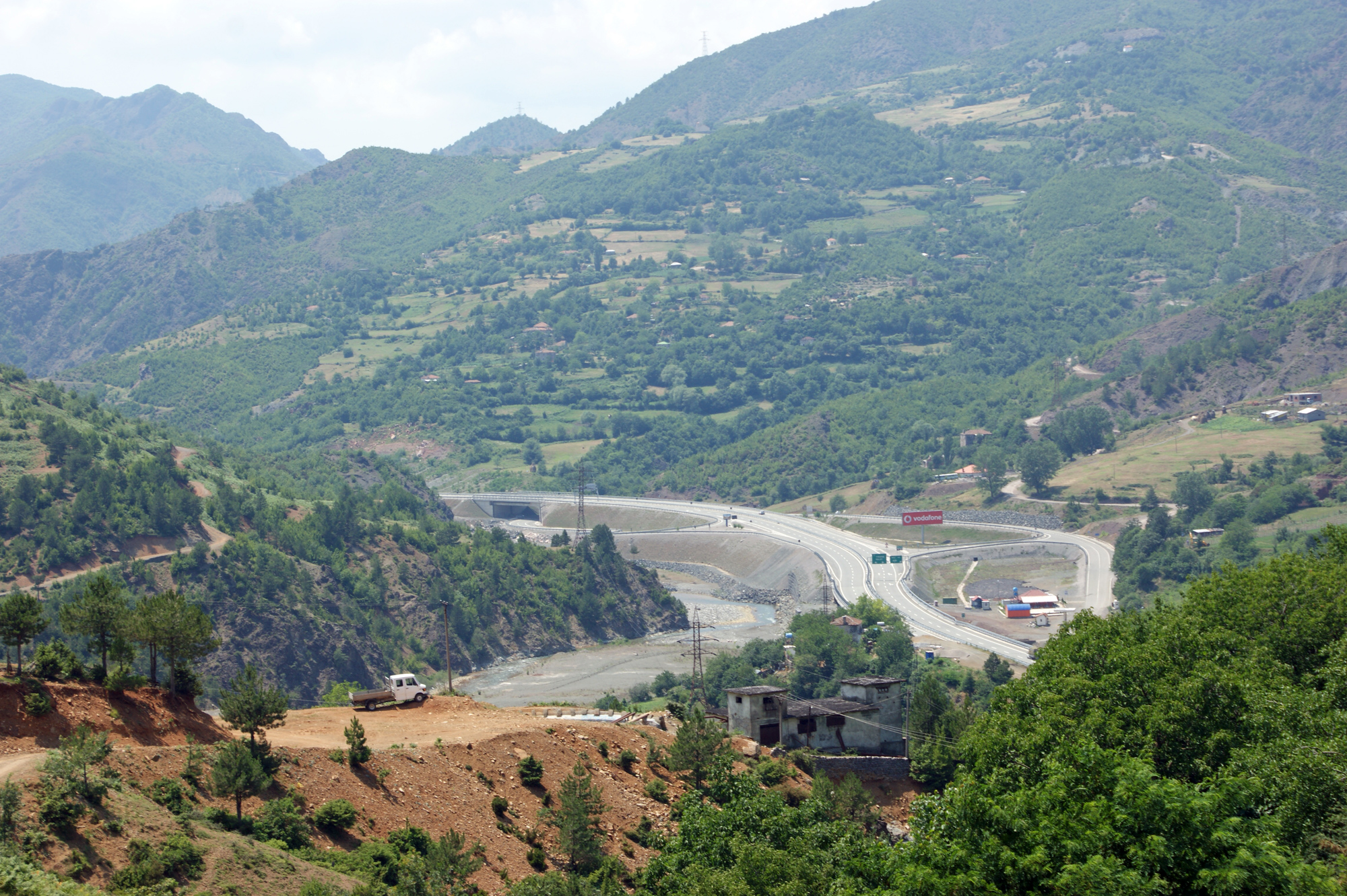
- Fan Valley in Reps

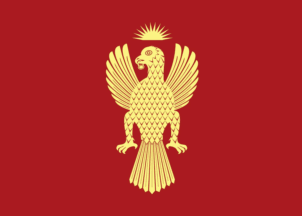
- Flag Emblem

- Location within Albania
- Coordinates: 41°46′N 19°53′E
- Country: Albania
- County: Lezhë

Government
  - Mayor: Albert Mëlyshi (BF)
- Elevation: 870.26 m (2,855.2 ft)

Population (2023)
  - Municipality: 13,625
- Demonym(s): Albanian: Mirditor (m), Mirditore (f)
- Time zone: UTC+1 (CET)
  - Summer (DST): UTC+2 (CEST)
- Postal Code: 4601-4602
- Area Code: (0)216
- Website: bashkiamirdite.gov.al

Mirditë (Albanian definite form: Mirdita) is a municipality in Lezhë County, northwestern Albania. It was created in 2015 by the merger of the former municipalities Fan, Kaçinar, Kthellë, Orosh, Rrëshen, Rubik and Selitë. The seat of the municipality is the town Rrëshen. The total population is 22,103 (2011 census), in a total area of 870.26 km^{2}. It is coterminous with the former Mirditë District. The municipality is located within the wider region of Mirdita whose territory is synonymous with the historic Albanian tribe of the same name.

During the time of Ottoman rule, Mirditë, along with the surrounding tribal regions, obtained a status of autonomy from the Ottomans and managed to preserve their Roman Catholic faith. The region is known as a stronghold of devout Catholicism.

== Gallery ==
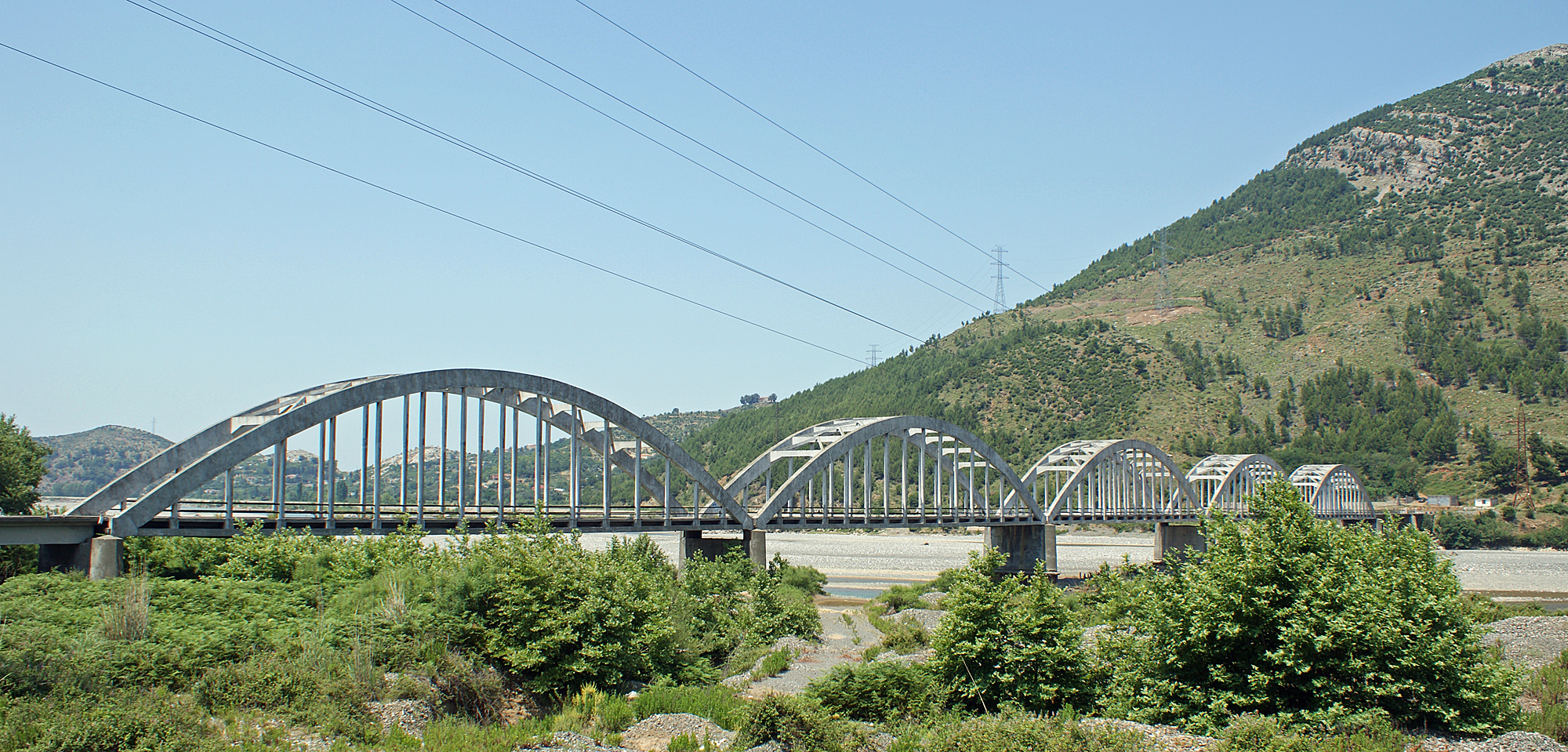
Zogu Bridge

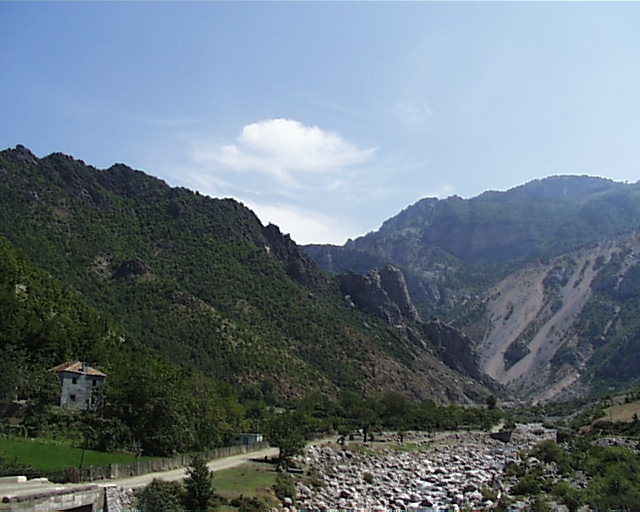
Fan River Canyon

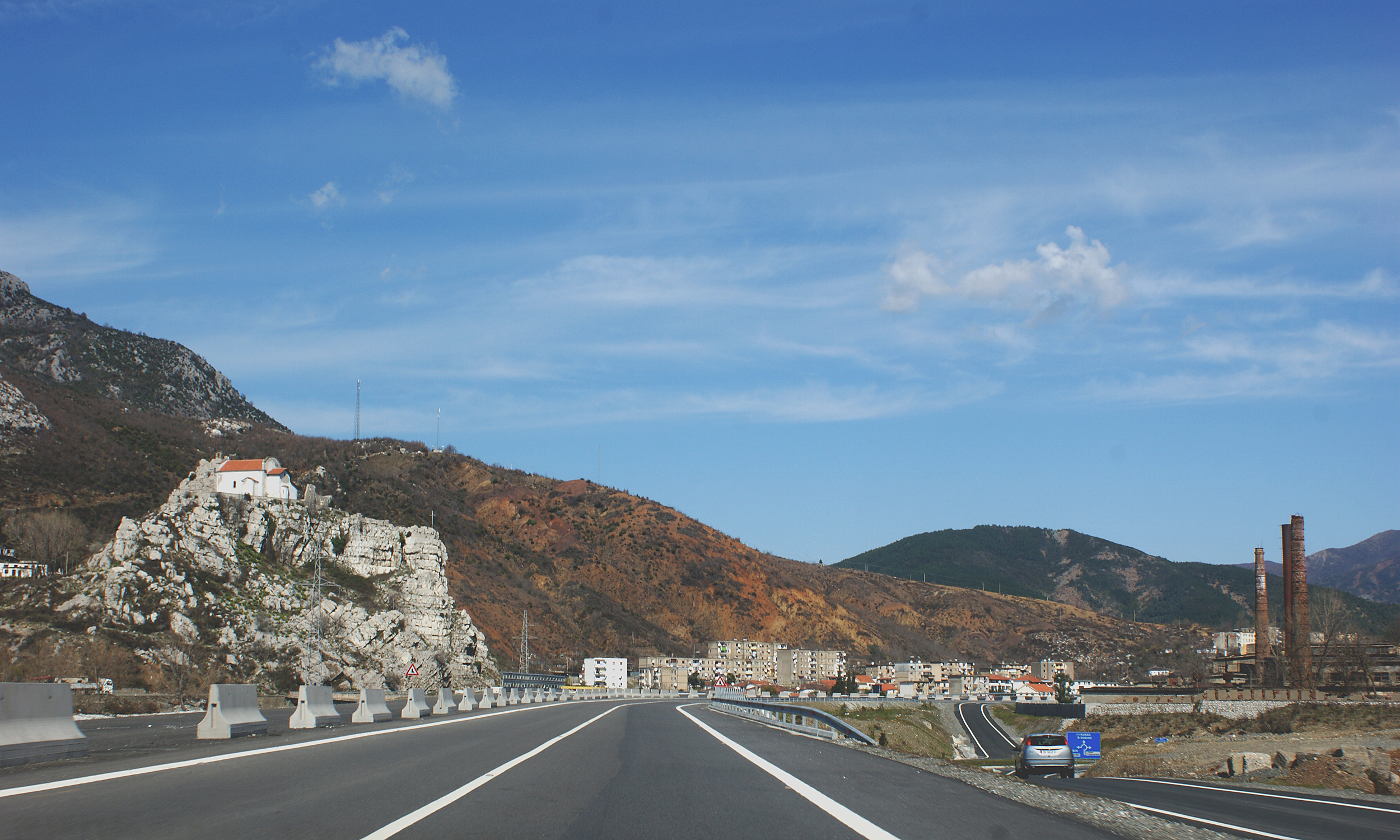
Rubik Catholic Church on top left along A1 Highway

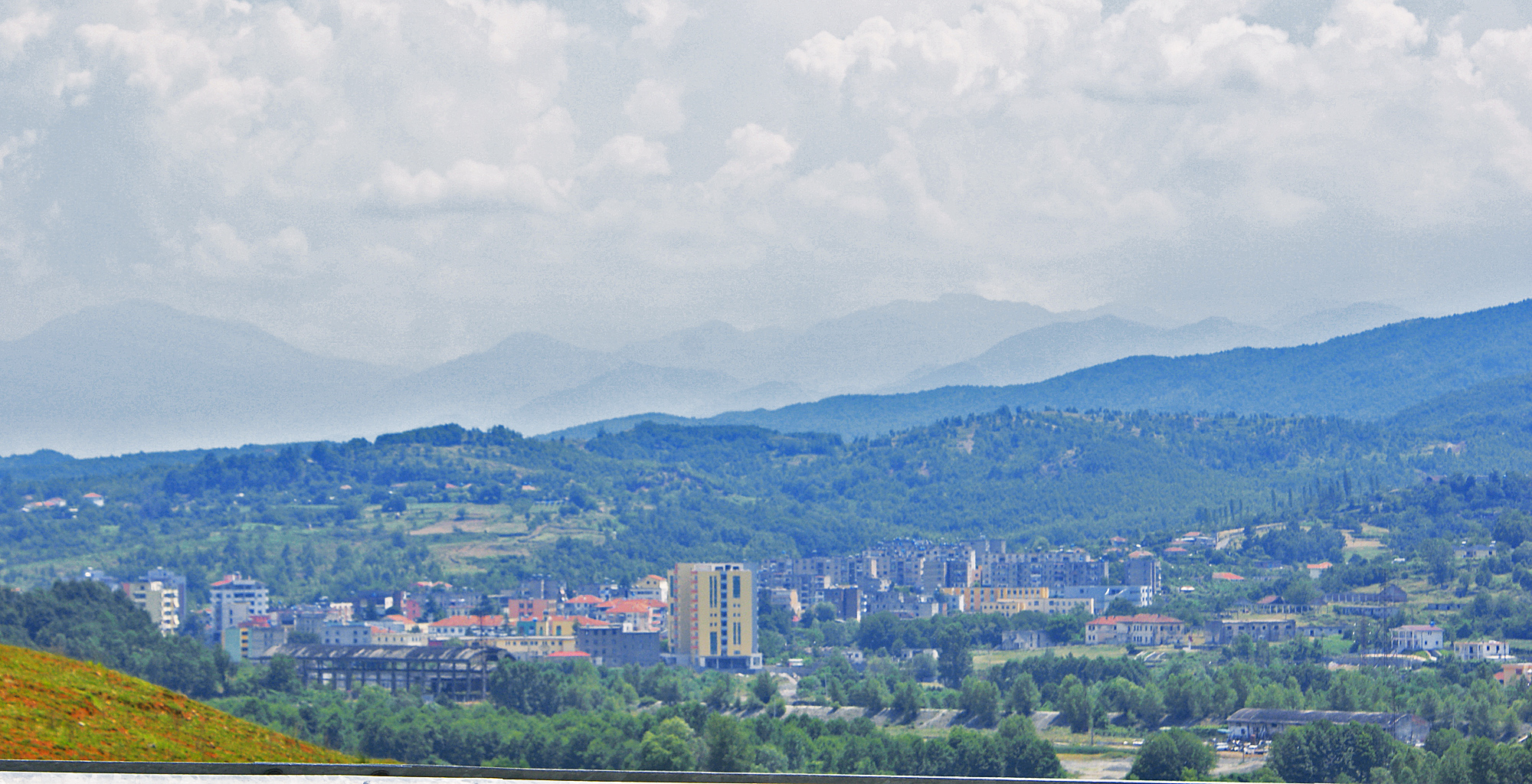
Rreshen from distance
