= Holy Synod of the Albanian Orthodox Church =

Governing body of the Albanian Orthodox Church

- Formation: 1929

Holy Synod of the Albanian Orthodox Church (Albanian: Sinodi i Shenjtë i Kishës Ortodokse Autoqefale të Shqipërisë) is the highest governing body of the church of Albanian Orthodox Church.

== History ==
The Albanian Orthodox Church was declared autocephalous initially by the Congress of Berat, on 10–19 September 1922. Its decisions were recognized by the Albanian government, which had pushed for its development. The "High Ecclesiastical Council" was appointed in Congress, which would temporarily lead the Church. In February 1929 the Holy Synod was formed consisting of:

- Visarion Xhuvani (who was made bishop in Serbia in 1925, by Russian bishops) as Archbishop of Albania and supervisor of the metropolis of Korça,
- Agathangjel Çamçe metropolitan of Berat,
- Ambroz Ikonomi, Metropolitan of Dryinopolis
- Efthim Kosteva, Archbishop Assistant.

On 29 June 1929, at the Second Clergy-Secular Congress held in Korça, the "Statute of the Autocephalous Orthodox Church of Albania" was voted.

The Ecumenical Patriarchate refused to accept these actions, but was willing to give itself self-government and in parallel the use of the Albanian language in worship, preaching and ecclesiastical education. Due to various political developments and dangers from the West, the Patriarchate agreed to discuss the issue of Autocephaly as well. She even sent to Albania for talks with the Albanian authorities the prominent Metropolitan of Trabzon, Chrysanthios, who later became Archbishop of Athens. Chrysanthemum spoke in favor of granting Autocephaly and suggested further progress.

In order to normalize relations with the Ecumenical Patriarchate, the Clergy-Laity Congress convened in Korça, in May 1936, with the participation of representatives from all 4 dioceses (ecclesiastical provinces). Congress apologized to the Patriarchate; talks took place in Athens (13 March 1937) and a commission composed of Albanians went to Constantinople to finally settle the matter.

On 25 December 1948 Archbishop Christopher was forced to leave and the new archbishop was appointed Pais Vodica, who at that time was bishop of Korça (he had remained a widower). It was also allowed to be held in Tirana, from 5–10 February 1950, the Clergy-Laity Assembly of the Orthodox Church, to vote on the new Statute, which in some points amended the Statute of the year 1929. The Church Hierarchy, after 1952, consisted of the Archbishop Pais Vodica of Tirana and all Albania, the Bishop Damian Kokoneshi of Gjirokastra, from Korça Filothe Duni, from Berat Cyril Naslazi and assistant bishop Sofron Borova. The canonical archbishop Christopher, was held under house arrest and on 19 June 1958 was found dead (according to the official version suffered a heart attack). In March 1966 Paisi died and in April he came to the throne Archbishop Damian. At this time the attempt to trample on religion and its representatives began; as well as the pressure of internment, imprisonment, and murder of clergy and laity.

Orthodox Albanians who settled in America were divided into two groups. One under the direction of Theofan Noli and later under that of Bishop Stefan Lasko, who had connections with the Church of Albania, while the other, under the direction of the Bishop of Lefka, Marko Lipa, who depended on Ecumenical Patriarchate. After the death of Noli, in March 1965, attempts were made (1966-1967), to reconcile the two groups, but to no avail.

== Situation from 1992 until today ==
In November 1990, the Albanian government, influenced by international changes, decided to ease measures against religion. In June 1992 the Exarch of the Patriarchate of Constantinople, Anastas Janullatos, was elected Archbishop of Tirana, Durrës and all Albania, through many difficulties, began the resurrection from the ruins of Autocephalous Orthodox Church of Albania.

In 1998, 31 years after its reorganization in 1967, the formation of the Holy Synod of Autocephalous Orthodox Church of Albania became possible again, after several years of negotiations between the representatives of the Ecumenical Patriarchate, the Church of Albania, and the authorities of the Albanian Government.

The enthronement of Ignatius, Metropolitan of Berat, Vlora, Kanina, and all of Myzeqe, took place on Saturday, 18 July 1998, in the city of Berat. Anastasius, Archbishop of Tirana, Durrës and all of Albania presided over the service, together with the two representatives of the Ecumenical Patriarchate, Evangelos, Metropolitan of Perga and Meliton, Metropolitan and Philadelphia.

That afternoon, Archbishop Anastasios and Metropolitan Ignat together created the first nucleus of the Holy Synod. Joined by two representatives of the Ecumenical Patriarchate, they held an extraordinary meeting of the Holy Synod in Tirana. These two representatives have been involved in negotiations on this issue with the Albanian authorities since 1992. During this historic meeting, the Holy Synod faced the most urgent problems regarding the Church of Albania. Resignations previously accepted by Alexander, former Metropolitan of Gjirokastra and by Kristodhuli, former Metropolitan of Korça.

Archimandrite Joan Pelushi was elected Metropolitan of Korça. He has previously served as lecturer and dean of the Theological Academy of the Albanian Orthodox Church. He graduated from the Orthodox Faculty of Theology "Honorary Cross" in America, with the degree of Master of Divinity. Elected Bishop of Apollonia was the Reverend Father Kozma Qirjo. He was 77 years old and represented the early generation of priests, who heroically continued to baptize and perform Divine Liturgy secretly even during the wild years of religious persecution.

The Archbishop Anastas together with Metropolitans Meliton and Ignat, presided over the handover of the Metropolitan of Korça, in front of a large number of believers at the Cathedral of the Annunciation of Theotokos, in Tirana, on 20th of July. Representatives of the Ecumenical Patriarchate left for Constantinople the next day. On 23rd of July, Archbishop Anastasios, together with Metropolitans Ignati and Joan, presided over the handover of the Bishop of Apollonia. Father Jani Trebicka was appointed General Secretary of the Holy Synod of the Autocephalous Orthodox Church of Albania.

On 11 August 2000, Kozma Qirjo died, and was replaced as Bishop of Apollonia by Archbishop Anastasios, who also acts as Viceroy of the Metropolitan of Gjirokastra. Following all the above developments, the Holy Synod of the Autocephalous Orthodox Church of Albania became Archbishop Anastasios, President; Metropolitan of Berat Ignati, Metropolitan of Korça Joani. Chief Secretary, Father Jani Trebicka.

In November 2006 the Synod was supplemented with three other hierarchs: the Metropolitan of Gjirokastra, Hirësi Dhimitri, who in the previous 15 years had served as the archbishop's overseer in this metropolis; Bishop of Apollonia Hirësi Nikolla and Bishop of Kruja, Hirësi Andoni, who both belong to the generation of young Albanian clergy formed at the Orthodox Theological Academy "Resurrection of Christ", Durrës.

Also in November 2006 the new Statute of the Autocephalous Orthodox Church of Albania was approved. In November 2008 was signed, according to the Constitution of the Republic of Albania (1998) the Agreement on the regulation of mutual relations between the Autocephalous Orthodox Church of Albania and the Council of Ministers, which was subsequently ratified by the Albanian Parliament and became the law of the Albanian State, with no. 10057, on 22.01. 2009.

Following the proposal of the Clergy-Laity Council, as defined by the new Statute of the Church, on 19 January 2012, at its meeting, the Holy Synod of the Autocephalous Orthodox Church of Albania elected two new titular bishops. Based on the New Statute of the Autocephalous Orthodox Church of Albania (Articles 17, 18), the Holy Synod decided with unanimous votes as Bishop of Amantias, Archimandrite Nathanail Lavrioti and as Bishop of Bylis, archimandrite Asti Bakallbashi. These auxiliary bishops of the Archbishop are also titular members with full rights in the Holy Synod.

Submissions to the episcopal rank of Bishop of Amantia Mr. Nathanail and the Bishop of Bylis, Mr. Asti, was performed by Archbishop Anastasios, with the participation of the entire Holy Synod, in the church "Evangelization of the Goddess", in Tirana, on 21–22 January 2012. These bishops also cover certain sectors of ecclesiastical life, for example "Supervision of the Monasteries" by Nathanail and "Apostolic Deaconry" (Apostolic Service by Asti).

On 11 and 12 March 2016, in the New Monastery of Saint Vlash in Durrës, under the leadership of the Archbishop of Tirana, Durrës and All Albania, Anastasi, was convened the Clergy-Laity Assembly of the Autocephalous Orthodox Church of Albania, consisting of 280 members. It unanimously reviewed and approved the amendment and improvement of some articles of the Statute of the Autocephalous Orthodox Church of Albania, which highlighted, among others, the creation of two new Metropolises, Apollonia and Fier, and Elbasan.

On 7 April 2016, the Holy Synod convened, which approved the amendments to the Statute of the Autocephalous Orthodox Church of Albania. The Holy Synod established two new metropolises: a) The Holy Metropolis of Apollonia and Fier, which includes the district of Fier, the area of Patos and Libofsha, detached from the Metropolitanate of Berat, Kaninë and Vlora; b) The Holy Metropolis of Elbasan, which includes the areas of Elbasan, Shpat and Librazhd, separated from the Archdiocese of Tirana and Durrës. In accordance with the Statute, following the proposal of the Clergy-Laity Council, the Holy Synod undertook to fill the vacancies of the newly established Metropolises through regular voting. For the Metropolitanate of Apollonia and Fier, Bishop Nikolla (Hyka) of Apollonia was elected. Bishop of Kruja, Andoni (Merdani), was elected Metropolitan of Elbasan. The Holy Synod then raised Bishop Nathanail (Lavrioti-Stergiu) to the rank of Metropolitan. Subsequently, in the chapel of the Holy Trinity in the Synodal Center, the corresponding Great Messages were given.

On 16 April 2016, in the Cathedral of Saint George, Fier, the Metropolitan of Apollonia and Fier, Nikolla, was enthroned.

On 17 April 2016, in the church of St. Nicholas, Elbasan, the Metropolitan of Elbasan, Andoni, was enthroned.

On 20 July 2024, following a period of poor health, Metropolitan of Berat Ignati died at the age of 89. The final sacramental and burial services took place on 23 July 2024. Metropolitan Ignat was laid to rest in the Cathedral of Saint Demetrius, Berat.

Following the passing of Metropolitan Ignat of Berat, Bishop of Bylis, Asti, on 14 November 2024 by a unanimous vote in the Holy Synod was elected to fill the vacant seat of the Holy Metropolitan Dioceses of Berat. On 21 November 2024, in the church of St. Demetrius, Berat, the Metropolitan of Berat, Vlorë and Kanina, Asti was enthroned.

On 9 December 2024, Archimandrite Anastas (Enkelejd) Mamaj was elected by the Holy Synod as (titular) Bishop of Kruja. The newly elected bishop was ordained Bishop of Krujë, and auxiliary bishop to the Archbishop, on 15 December 2024 in the Resurrection of Christ Cathedral, Tiranë.

Archbishop Anastas was hospitalised on 30 December 2024. He initially underwent a surgical procedure due to complications from a seasonal flu. Later his health deteriorated, and on 3 January 2025 Archbishop Anastas was transported to Athens for specialised treatment. However, due to his advanced age of 95, in 25 January 2025, Archbishop Anastas died as a result of multiple organ failure. On the same day the members of the Holy Synod convened to declare a 3-day mourning period, funeral arrangements and electing Metropolitan John of Korça as the Locum Tenens of the Archbishopic Throne. On 30 January 2025, the final sacremental and burial service were led by The Ecumenical Patriarch of Constantinople, His All Holiness Bartholomew, Primates and delegates of other sister Orthodox Churches, Metropolitan John of Korça (as Locum Tenens) and members of the Albanian Orthodox Synod and clergy. Archbishop Anastas was buried in the Resurrection of Christ Cathedral, Tiranë.

On 16 March 2025, the second Sunday of the Great and Holy Lent (Sunday of Gregory Palamas), after the Divine Liturgy the members of the Holy Synod assembled to elect the new Archbishop and Primate of the Albanian Orthodox Church. The members of the Holy Synod unanimously elected the Metropolitan John of Korça as the next Archbishop of Tiranë, Durrës and all Albania. The newly installed Archbishop John, on 29 March 2025 was enthroned in the Cathedral of the Resurrection of Christ, Tiranë as Primate of the Albania and Exarch of Illyricum.

Metropolitan Dhimitër of Gjirokastër suffered poor health and was admitted in the University General Hospital of Ioannina after an respiratory infection and endocarditis. After a short period of time, due to multiple organ failure, Metropolitan Dhimitër, aged 85, died on 28 June 2025. The final and burial service took place on 1 July 2025.

On the 16th of September the Holy Synod convened and unanimously elected Nathanail, Titular Metropolitan of Amantia and Anastas, Titular Bishop of Krujë as Metropolitan of Gjirokastër and Metropolitan of Korçë, respectively. Archimandrite Ignat Todri was chosen as Chief Secretary of the Holy Synod of the Autocephalous Orthodox Church of Albania. On Saturday the 20th of September, Metropolitan of Nathanail was enthroned Metropolitan of Gjirokastër in the Cathedral of the Resurrection of Christ in Gjirokastër. The following week, 27th of September, Bishop Anastas was enthroned Metropolitan of Korçë in the Resurrection of Christ Cathedral in Korçë.

The Holy Synod of the Autocephalous Orthodox Church of Albania consists of (as of September 2025):

- Archbishop of Tirana, Durrës and all Albania, John, Exarch of Illyricum, and President of the Holy Synod
- Metropolitan of Korça, Anastas
- Metropolitan of Berat, Vlorë and Kaninë, Asti
- Metropolitan of Gjirokastra, Nathanaili
- Metropolitan of Apollonia and Fier, Nikolla
- Metropolitan of Elbasan, Shpat and Librazhd, Andoni
- Chief Secretary of the Holy Synod, Archimandrite Ignat

== Sources ==
- Kalendari Ortodoks 2013, botim i Kishës Ortodokse Autoqefale të Shqipërisë, Tiranë.
- Kisha Orthodhokse Autoqefale e Shqipërisë
- Sinodi i Shenjtë
- The Holy Synod of Albania
- Statuti i KOASH-it i vitit 1923
- Statuti i KOASH-it i vitit 1929
- Rregullorja e administrimit të përgjithshëm të Kishës (1929)
- Statuti i KOASH-it i vitit 1950 me shtesat e vitit 1996
- Rregullore mbi administrimin e përgjithshëm të KOASh-it, 1955
- Statuti i KOASH-it, 2006
- Civilta Cattolica, 2005
