= Agathangjel Çamçe =

Albanian bishop

His Eminence Agathangjel
- Bishop of Korçë
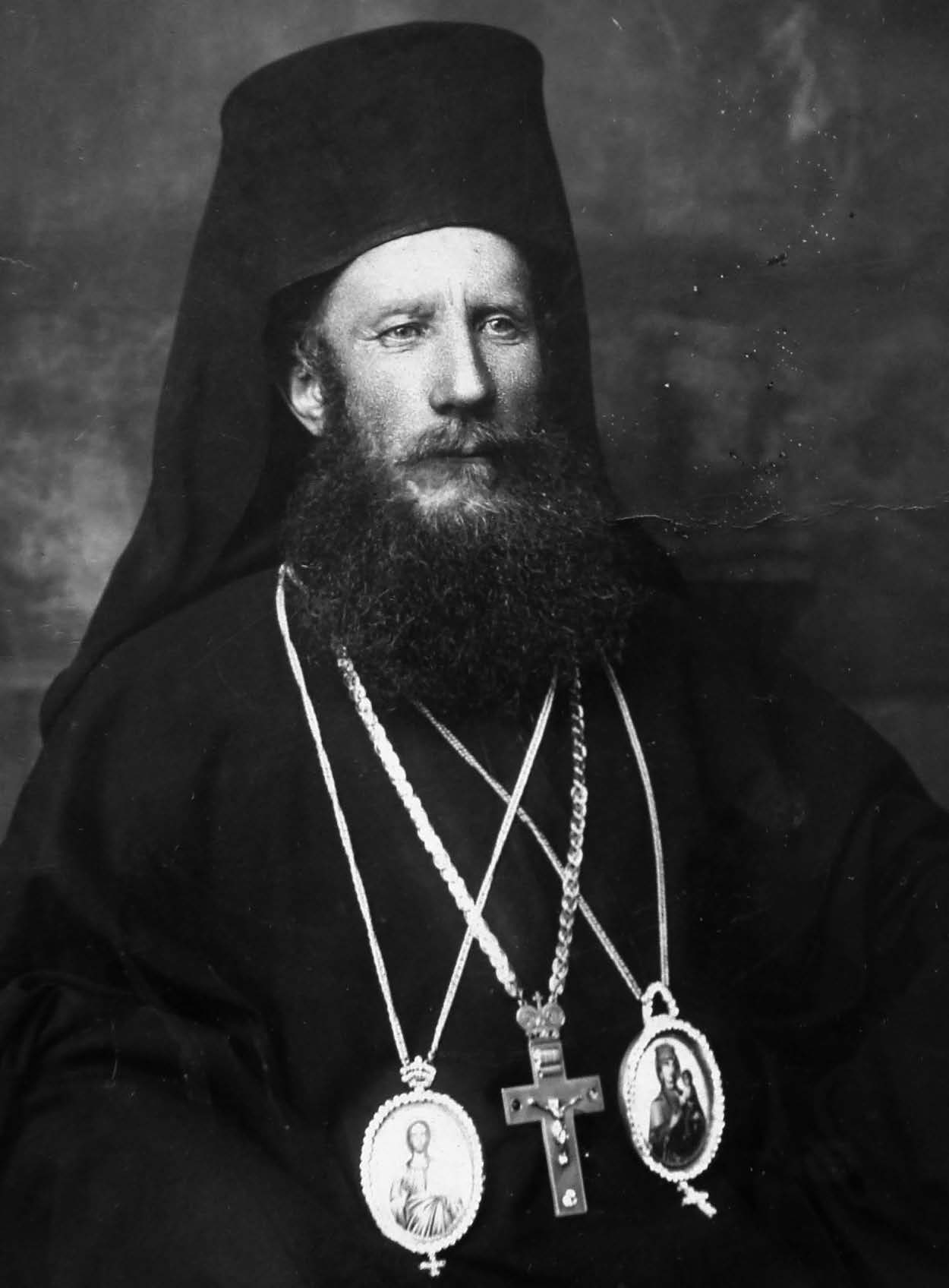
- Installed: 1941
- Term ended: 1946
- Predecessor: Evllogji Kurilla
- Successor: Pais Vodica
- Previous posts: Bishop of Berat, Vlorë, Kaninë and All Myzeqe (1929-1941)

Personal details
- Born: Vangjel Çamçe; 1877 Korçë, Ottoman Empire (present-day Albania)
- Died: 1946 (aged 68–69)
- Profession: Theologian

Bishop Agathangjel (secular name Vangjel Çamçe; 1877–1946) was an Albanian Orthodox cleric and important figure of the early Albanian Orthodox Church. He was a staunch supporter of the autocephaly of Albanian Orthodoxy and a close collaborator of Fan Noli, founding father of the Albanian Orthodox Church. He was metropolitan bishop of Berat and was a member of the Holy Synod of the Albanian Orthodox Church.

He was born in the city of Korça in 1877. In 1913, he emigrated to the United States, where he distinguished himself as an activist of the Albanian National Movement. In 1919, he was ordained a priest in New York, where he served for two years preaching to Eastern Orthodox Albanians in the Albanian language. While in America, in the same year he laid the foundations of Saint Mary's Orthodox Church in Natick, Massachusetts, one of the centers of the Albanian diaspora and its patriotic movement.

In 1921, Agathangjel Çamçe returned to Albania and a year later participated in the Congress of Berat (September 10–17, 1922), where Autocephaly was proclaimed. On 18 February 1929, he was made Bishop of Berat, Vlora and Kanina in the Cathedral Church of the Evangelization in Tirana, by bishop Visarion Xhuvani and bishop Viktor, becoming part of the synod. Together with the Serbian bishop of Shkodër and another bishop, Evthim Ikonomi, Agathangjel Çamçe created the 2d Synod of the Albanian Orthodox Church with Visarion Xhuvani as leader. In October 1940, Agathangjel Çamçe took part in the special synod organized by the Italian-Albanian eparchies at the Abbey of Grottaferrata, where under discussion was the possibility of Grottaferrata welcoming the newly converted Orthodox clergy and assisting their theological training. In 1941, Agathangjel Çamçe was made Metropolitan of Korça. He led the metropolitan dioceses until his death in 1964. After the Italian invaders’ evacuation, Fan Noli together with A. Çamçe from Jamestown, New York, and Father Vasil Marku from Saint Louis, Missouri, came to Albania to offer their services to the Albanian government. He died in 1946.

== Sources ==
- Bido, Ardit (2020). The Albanian Orthodox Church: A Political History, 1878–1945. Routledge. ISBN 978-0-429-75546-0.
