= Albanian Orthodox Archbishopric of Tirana-Durrës =

Archbishopric of Tirana-Durrës Kryepiskopata e Shenjtë e Tiranës dhe e Durrësit

Location
- Country: Albania
- Territory: central and northern Albania
- Headquarters: Tirana, Albania

Information
- Denomination: Eastern Orthodox
- Sui iuris church: Albanian Orthodox Church
- Language: Albanian, Greek

Current leadership
- Bishop: John Pelushi (2025–present)

Website
- Holy Archiepiscopate of Tirana and Durres

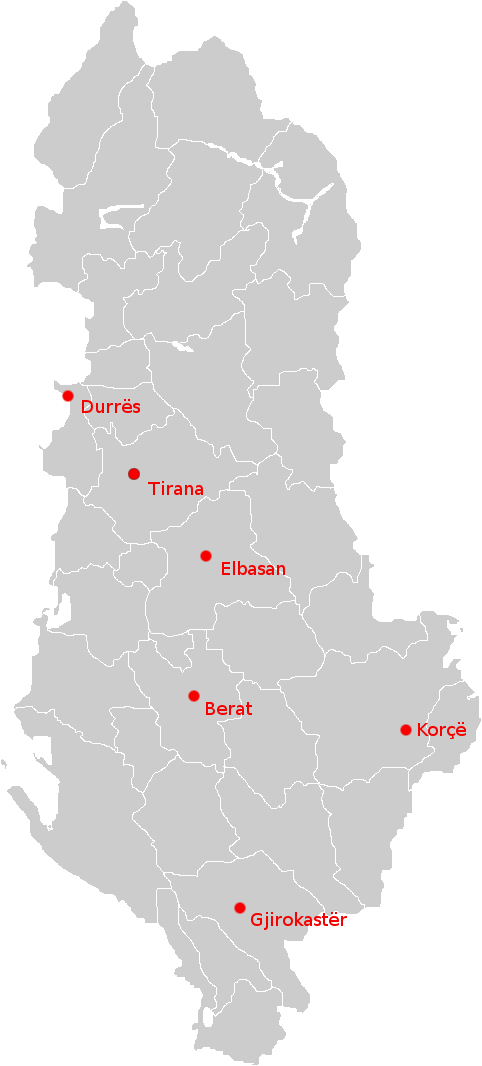
Episcopal seats of the Albanian Orthodox Church, including the Archbishopric of Tirana-Durrës

Albanian Orthodox Archbishopric of Tirana-Durrës (Albanian: Kryepiskopata e Shenjtë e Tiranës dhe e Durrësit) is the principal (central) Eastern Orthodox eparchy (diocese) of the Albanian Orthodox Church. It is headquartered in Tirana, the capital city of Albania. Secondary title (Durrës) refers to the nearby coastal city (Greek: Δυρράχιον, Latin: Dyrrachium), the most important historical center of Christianity in the region. The Archbishopric covers central and northern regions of modern Albania. Since 1992, it is headed by Archbishop Anastasios of Tirana-Durrës and All Albania. Form 2025 by John of Albania.

== History ==
Modern Archbishopric was created as a result of ecclesiastical reorganization, that was originally initiated within the Albanian movement for autocephaly. In 1912, creation of the modern Albanian state was declared. At that time, central regions of the country belonged to the ancient Eparchy of Durrës, under the jurisdiction of the Patriarchate of Constantinople. In 1917, during the occupation of Albania in the First World War, Metropolitan Jacob (Greek: Ιάκωβος) had to leave Durrës for Constantinople, but did not resign his post, hoping to return. After the war, movement for Albanian autocephaly gained momentum, thus preventing Metropolitan Jacob from returning to Durrës. In the same time, transfer of the diocesan see from Durrës to Tirana was proposed. Several provisional solutions were implemented during the period between 1918 and 1928, resulting in election of Visarion Xhuvani as archbishop of Tirana-Durrës (1929–1936). Since that time, the Archbishopric of Tirana-Durrës has remained the principal eparchy of the Albanian Orthodox Church.

== See also ==
- Albanian Orthodox Church
- Eastern Orthodoxy in Albania
- Roman Catholic Archbishopric of Tirana-Durrës

== Sources ==
- Bido, Ardit (2020). The Albanian Orthodox Church: A Political History, 1878–1945. London: Routledge.
- Elsie, Robert (2001). A Dictionary of Albanian Religion, Mythology and Folk Culture. London: Hurst & Company.
- Hoxha, Artan R. (2022). Communism, Atheism, and the Orthodox Church of Albania: Cooperation, Survival, and Suppression, 1945-1967. London-New York: Routledge.
- Kiminas, Demetrius (2009). The Ecumenical Patriarchate: A History of Its Metropolitanates with Annotated Hierarch Catalogs. Wildside Press LLC.
