= Kristofor =

Kristofor is a given name.

- Kristofor Kisi (1881–1958), primate of the Orthodox Autocephalous Church of Albania
- Kristofor Lawrence Griffin, or Kris Griffin (born 1981), American professional football player
