= Archbishop of Tirana =

Archbishop of Tirana (Albanian: Tiranë) may refer to:

- Eastern Orthodox Archbishop of Tirana-Durrës, head of the Albanian Orthodox Church
- Roman Catholic Archbishop of Tirana-Durrës, senior Catholic prelate in Albania

== See also ==
- Archdiocese of Tirana (disambiguation)
