= Paisi of Albania =

Archbishop of Albania from 1949 to 1966

His Beatitude Paisi
- Archbishop of Albania
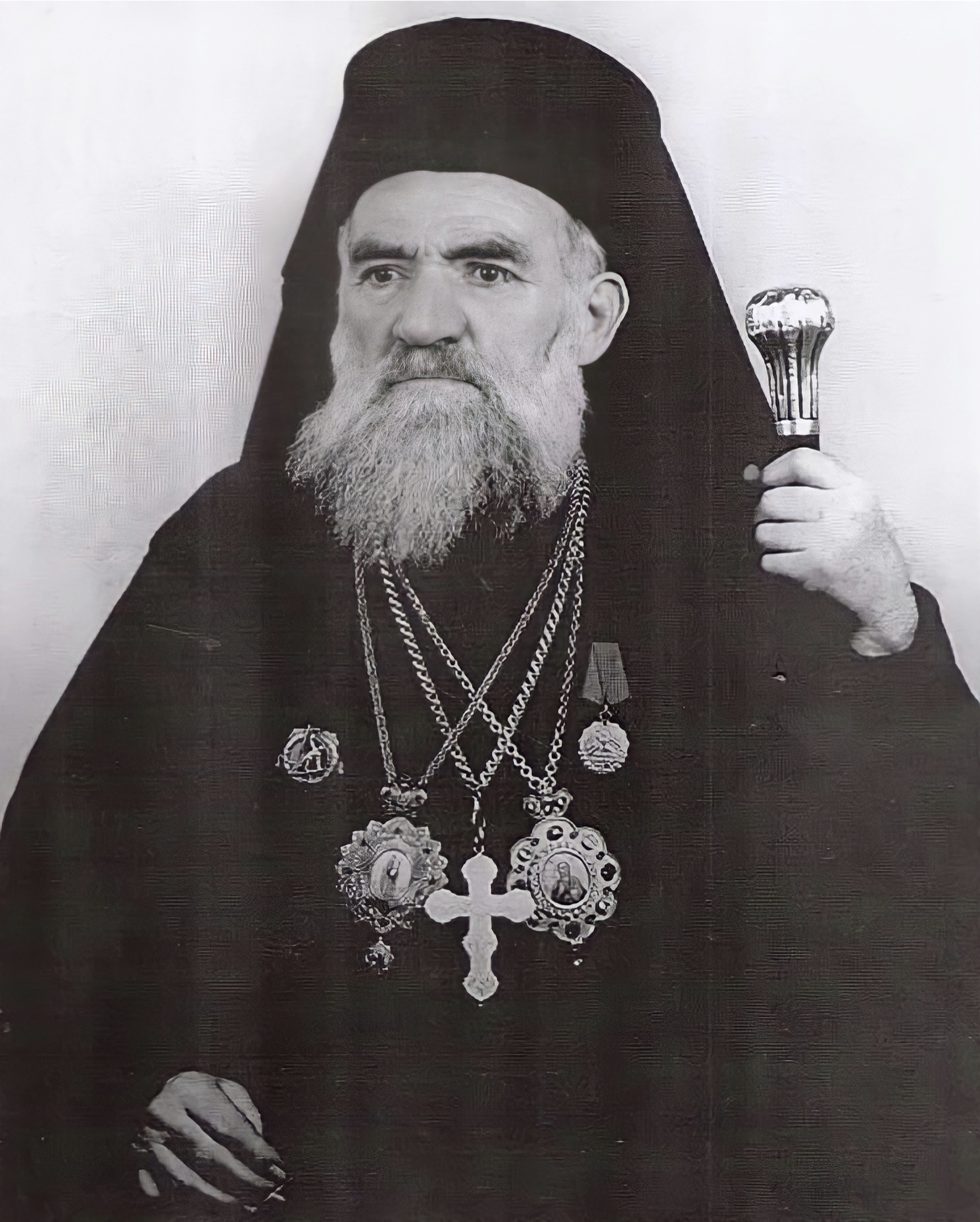
- Installed: 25 August 1949
- Term ended: 4 March 1966
- Predecessor: Christopher
- Successor: Damian
- Previous post: Bishop of Korçë (1947-1949)

Personal details
- Born: Pashko Vodica; 1881 Vodicë, Kolonjë, Albania (then Ottoman Empire)
- Died: 4 March 1966 (aged 84–85) Tirana, People's Socialist Republic of Albania

Archbishop Paisi (Albanian: Kryepeshkop Paisi; secular name Pashko Vodica; 1881 – 4 March 1966) was the Primate of the Orthodox Autocephalous Church of Albania, holding the title Archbishop of Tirana, Durrës, and all Albania, from his installation on August 25, 1949, until his death on March 4, 1966.

Paisi, who was formerly the Bishop of Korçë and had joined the communist-led National Liberation Front during World War II, succeeded Archbishop Christopher Kisi. Archbishop Kisi was forcibly deposed by Albania's communist regime in August 1949, and Paisi's subsequent appointment to lead the Church received strong support from the state authorities. Following Archbishop Paisi's death, he was succeeded by Archbishop Damian Kokoneshi in April 1966.

Archbishop Paisi was the father of Josif Pashko, who became a high-ranking official in the Albanian communist government.

== Life ==
Pashko Vodica was born in 1881 in the village of Vodicë, Kolonjë region, in southern Albania, at that time part of the Ottoman Empire. He began his primary education in his hometown but did not complete it. In 1910, Pashko, who was married by this time, was ordained a priest. In 1912, he was arrested by the Ottoman authorities due to his activities in support of the Albanian national movement. In 1920, following the death of his wife, he was elevated to the dignity of Archimandrite. Two years later, in 1922, he participated in the Orthodox Congress of Berat, at which the Autocephalous Orthodox Church of Albania declared its autocephaly.

During World War II, Pashko Vodica joined the National Liberation Front, fighting along the Communist forces. On April 18, 1948, Archimandrite Pashko Vodica was consecrated Bishop of Korçë. The consecration was performed by Archbishop Christopher (Kisi) with the participation of Russian Orthodox Bishop Nestor (Sidoruk) (1904–1951).

Pashko Vodica, who upon his election as primate took the name Paisi, had the strong support of the Communist authorities to succeed Archbishop Christopher Kisi in 1949, and his subsequent actions reportedly never disappointed them. He openly demonstrated his communist affiliation in telegrams sent to Enver Hoxha and to Alexius I, Patriarch of Moscow and all Russia. The appointment of Paisi as Archbishop of Tirana, Durrës, and all Albania on August 25, 1949, was followed by the formation of a new Holy Synod. This Synod included Archbishop Paisi; Kiril Naslazi, Bishop of Berat; Fillothe Duni, Bishop of Korçë; Damian Kokoneshi, Bishop of Gjirokastër; and Suffragan Bishop Sofron Borova.

Archbishop Paisi visited the Soviet Union twice. By the early 1960s, pressure on the church from the communist regime was intensifying, although Paisi reportedly never openly opposed the authorities. He remained Primate of the Orthodox Autocephalous Church of Albania until his death on March 4, 1966, in Tirana. He was succeeded by Archbishop Damian.
