= Archdiocese of Tirana =

Archdiocese of Tirana (Albanian: Tiranë) may refer to:

- Albanian Orthodox Archdiocese of Tirana-Durrës, the principal diocese of Albanian Orthodox Church
- Roman Catholic Archdiocese of Tirana-Durrës, a senior Catholic diocese in Albania

== See also ==
- Archbishop of Tirana (disambiguation)
