= Valid name =

Valid name can refer to:

Biology:

- Valid name (zoology), equivalent to the correct name in botany and bacteriology.
- A validly published name in botany, not necessarily legitimate or correct.
- A validly published name in bacteriology, not necessarily legitimate or correct.

Other:

- Name at birth
- Legal name
- Legal name (business)
