= Damian of Albania =

Archbishop of Albania from 1966 to 1973

His Beatitude Damian
- Archbishop of Albania
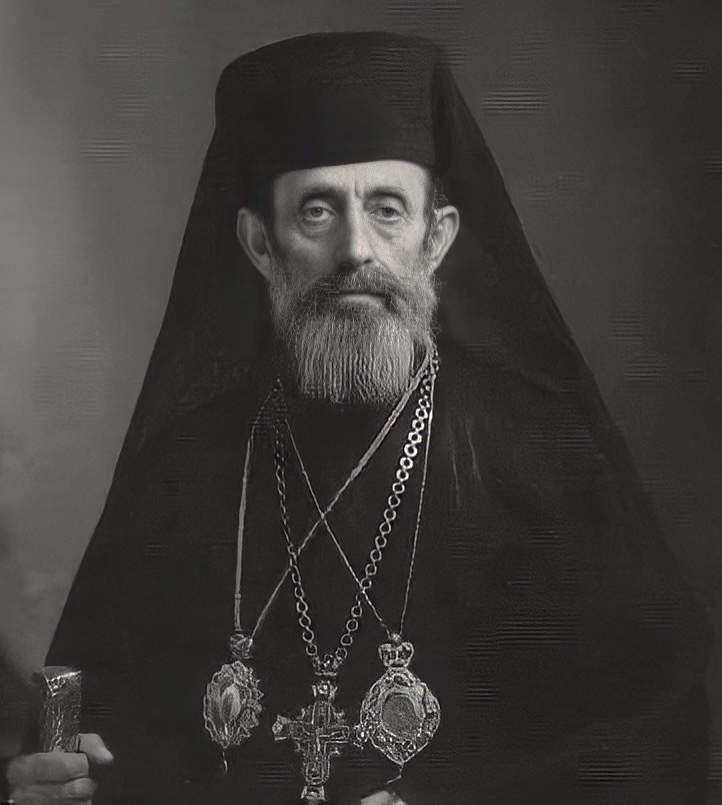
- Installed: 7 March 1966
- Term ended: 8 October 1973
- Predecessor: Paisi (1966)
- Successor: Post Abolished (Anastasi following re-establishment in 1992)
- Previous post: Bishop of Korçë (1962-1965) Bishop of Gjirokastër (1952-1966)

Personal details
- Born: Dhimitër Kokoneshi; 26 October 1886 Mokër, Manastir Vilayet, Ottoman Empire (modern-day Albania)
- Died: 8 October 1973 (aged 86) Pogradec, Communist Albania (modern-day Albania)
- Education: Normal School of Monastir (1896); Academy of Theology in Ioannina (1925)

Styles of The Archbishop of Tirana, Durrës and all Albania
- Reference style: His Beatitude
- Spoken style: Your Beatitude
- Religious style: Archbishop
- Posthumous style: N/A

Archbishop Damian (Albanian: Kryepeshkopi Damian, secular name Dhimitër Kokoneshi; 26 October 1886 – 8 October 1973) was the bishop of the Orthodox Autocephalous Church of Albania and its primate from 7 March 1966. De facto he led the Church until February 1967, when the religion was abolished in Albania.

== Life ==
Kokoneshi was born on October 10, 1886, in the village of Llëngë in Mokër region, (part of then Ottoman Empire), near Pogradec in today's Albania. He was born into an Aromanian family. His early education included attending the Normal School of Monastir in 1896 and the Academy of Theology in Ioannina in 1925.

On November 27, 1918, the Émigré Albanian Orthodox clerics sent a signed petition to the U.S. President, then Woodrow Wilson, asking for support of Albanian Church becoming autocephalous. The cleric's position was based on Albania becoming an independent country. The petition was signed by Father Theofan Stilian Noli, Father Damian Kokoneshi, Father Naum Cëre, Father Vasil Marko Kondili, Father Pando Sinica, and Father Vangjel Çamçe, future metropolitan Agathangjeli. The petition was supported by the Albanian Church Assembly ("Kuvendi Kishëtar") in Boston, MA on July 30, 1919. Autocephaly was finally declared at the Congress of Berat on September 12, 1922.

On February 10, 1942, Kokoneshi, well known in his native region, led a delegation of Mokër leaders to a meeting with representatives of the National Liberation Movement. At that time, Kokoneshi was referred to as Papa Dhimitër Kokoneshi. The meeting led to the formation of a partisan regional battalion, which he joined. Similar to his predecessor as bishop of the Orthodox Autocephalous Church of Albania, Pashko Vodica, Kokoneshi and the new regime showed mutual support and respect for each other.

In January 1948, Kokoneshi, with the rank of archpriest, visited Moscow as a member of the Albanian Orthodox Church delegation. In 1952, Kokoneshi was consecrated bishop of Gjirokastra. In 1958, he made another visit to the USSR with a delegation of the Church of Albania.

In April 1966, after the death of Archbishop Paisius, the Holy Synod of the Albanian Orthodox Church elected Bishop Damian as Archbishop of Tirana and all of Albania.

In 1967, Damian of Albania was arrested during the beginning of the massive anti-religious campaign of that time in Albania. Religion would be abolished in the Socialist People's Republic of Albania and many clerics would be arrested and imprisoned. Properties of the four religious communities would be confiscated, and many of the clerics who were spared were required to work menial jobs.

Damian of Albania was arrested one year after taking the office, in April 1967, and was imprisoned shortly thereafter. After his release, he retired to his home in Pogradec where he died on October 18, 1973.

The Orthodox world learned of his death nearly seven months later, in May 1974. His pro-communist background and age helped the Archbishop avoid the severe persecution that was common against the high level clerics of the time.

== Recognition ==
Kokoneshi was declared an Honorary Citizen of Korçë County in 2003 for his contribution to the establishment of the Autocephalous Albanian Orthodox Church.
