= Eastern Orthodoxy in Albania =

Eastern Orthodoxy arrived in the areas of Illyrii proprie dicti or Principality of Arbanon during the period of the Byzantine Empire. Those areas fell under the Ottoman Empire during the late medieval times and Eastern Orthodoxy underwent deep sociopolitical difficulties that lasted until the fall of the Ottoman Empire. Between 1913 and until the start of WWII under the newly recognized state of Albania, Eastern Orthodoxy saw a revival, and in 1937 after a short Eastern Orthodoxy schism and contestation, the Autocephaly was recognized. Decades of persecution under the Communist state atheism, which started in 1967 and officially ended in December 1990, greatly weakened all religions and their practices especially Christians of Albania. The post-communist period and the lifting of legal and other government restrictions on religion allowed Orthodoxy to revive through institutions and enabled the development of new infrastructure, literature, educational facilities, international transnational links and other social activities.

== History ==
=== Early history and the Middle Ages ===
Christianity first arrived in the areas of the Principality of Arbanon through the preachings of Saint Paul during the 1st century. Saint Paul wrote that he preached in the Roman province of Illyricum, and legend holds that he visited Dyrrachium. It was Saint Astius, a 2nd-century Illyrian and Christian martyr venerated by the Roman Catholic and Eastern Orthodox churches, that served as bishop of Durrës (Dyrrachium), during the time of the emperor Trajan (98–117). Astius is the Patron Saint and Protector of Durrës. However, it was the Roman emperor of Illyrian origin, Constantine the Great, who issued the Edict of Milan and legalized Christianity, making the Christian religion official in what is now the territory of Albania.

The schism of 1054, however, formalized the split of Christianity into two branches, Roman Catholics and Orthodox Catholics, that was reflected in areas of the Principality of Arbanon with the emergence of a Catholic north and Orthodox south. In the 11th century, the Roman Catholic church created the archbishopric in Bar, that brought the bishoprics of Drivast, Ulcinj, Shkodër, and others under its control. As such, during the latter half of 12th century Roman Catholicism spread in northern Albania and partially made inroads among the population in the south. Up until the beginning of the nineteenth century, Catholicism remained a minority among Albanians while in the south of today's Albania, Orthodox Christianity was dominant.

The Principality of Muzaka was an independent Albanian state that existed in the 13th–15th centuries in the area of modern southern Albania and northwestern Greece. It was governed by the Muzaka family and adhered to the Eastern Orthodox faith. During their rule, the family sponsored the construction of several notable Eastern Orthodox religious buildings. The principality was conquered by the Ottomans in 1450.

=== Ottoman Period ===
The official Ottoman recognition of the Orthodox church resulted in the Orthodox population being tolerated until the late 18th century and the traditionalism of the church's institutions slowed the process of conversion to Islam amongst Albanians. The Orthodox population of central and south-eastern Albania was under the ecclesiastical jurisdiction of the Orthodox Archbishopric of Ohrid, while south-western Albania was under the Patriarchate of Constantinople through the Metropolis of Ioannina. In the early 16th century the Albanian cities of Gjirokastër, Kaninë, Delvinë, Vlorë, Korçë, Këlcyrë, Përmet and Berat were still Christian and by the late 16th century Vlorë, Përmet and Himarë were still Christian, while Gjirokastër increasingly became Muslim. Conversion to Islam in cities overall within Albania was slow during the 16th century as around only 38% of the urban population had become Muslim. The city of Berat from 1670 onward became mainly Muslim and its conversion is attributed in part to a lack of Christian priests being able to provide religious services.

Differences between Christian Albanians of central Albania and archbishops of Ohrid led to conversions to Bektashi Islam that made an appeal to all while insisting little on ritual observance. Central Albania, such as the Durrës area had by end of the 16th century become mainly Muslim. Consisting of plains and being an in between area of northern and southern Albania, central Albania was a hub on the old Via Egnatia road that linked commercial, cultural and transport connections which were subject to direct Ottoman administrative control and religious Muslim influence. The conversion to Islam of most of central Albania has thus been attributed in large part to the role its geography played in the socio-political and economic fortunes of the region.

During the late eighteenth century Orthodox Albanians converted in large numbers to Islam due overwhelmingly to the Russo-Turkish wars of the period and events like the Russian instigated Orlov revolt (1770) that made the Ottomans view the Orthodox population as allies of Russia. As some Orthodox Albanians rebelled against the Ottoman Empire, the Porte responded with and at times applied force to convert Orthodox Albanians to Islam while also providing economic measures to stimulate religious conversion. During this time conflict between newly converted Muslim Albanians and Orthodox Albanians occurred in certain areas. Examples include the coastal villages of Borsh attacking Piqeras in 1744, making some flee abroad to places such as southern Italy. Other areas such as 36 villages north of the Pogoni area converted in 1760 and followed it up with an attack on Orthodox Christian villages of the Kolonjë, Leskovik and Përmet areas leaving many settlements sacked and ruined.

By the late eighteenth century socio-political and economic crises alongside nominal Ottoman government control resulted in local banditry and Muslim Albanian bands raided Aromanian, Greek and Orthodox Albanian settlements located today within and outside contemporary Albania. Within Albania those raids culminated in Vithkuq, mainly an Orthodox Albanian centre, Moscopole (Albanian: Voskopojë) mainly an Aromanian centre, both with Greek literary, educational and religious culture and other smaller settlements being destroyed. Those events pushed some Aromanians and Orthodox Albanians to migrate afar to places such as Macedonia, Thrace and so on. Some Orthodox individuals, known as neo-martyrs, attempted to stem the tide of conversion to Islam amongst the Orthodox Albanian population and were executed in the process. Notable among these individuals was Cosmas of Aetolia, (died 1779) a Greek monk and missionary who traveled and preached afar as Krujë, opened many Greek schools before being accused as a Russian agent and executed by Ottoman Muslim Albanian authorities. Cosmas advocated for Greek education and spread of Greek language among illiterate Christian non-Greek speaking peoples so that they could understand the scriptures, liturgy and thereby remain Orthodox while his spiritual message is revered among contemporary Orthodox Albanians. By 1798 a massacre perpetrated against the coastal Orthodox Albanian villages of Shënvasil and Nivicë-Bubar by Ali Pasha, semi-independent ruler of the Pashalik of Yanina led to another sizable wave of conversions of Orthodox Albanians to Islam.

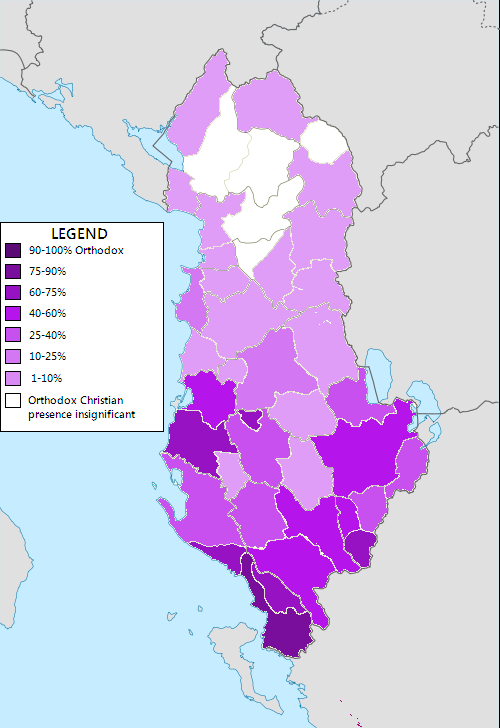
Distribution of Orthodox Christians in Albania, based on the 1877, 1908 and 1918 censuses.

Other conversions such as those in the region of Labëria occurred due to ecclesiastical matters when for example during a famine the local Orthodox bishop refused to grant a break in the fast to consume milk with threats of hell. Conversion to Islam also was undertaken for economic reasons which offered a way out of heavy taxation such as the jizya or poll tax and other difficult Ottoman measures imposed on Christians while opening up opportunities such as wealth accumulation and so on. Other multiple factors that led to conversions to Islam were the poverty of the Church, illiterate clergy, a lack of clergy in some areas and worship in a language other than Albanian. Additionally the reliance of the bishoprics of Durrës and southern Albania upon the declining Archbishopric of Ohrid, due in part to simony weakened the ability of Orthodox Albanians in resisting conversion to Islam. Crypto-Christianity also occurred in certain instances throughout Albania in regions such as Shpat amongst populations that had recently converted from Orthodoxy to Islam. Gorë, a borderland region straddling contemporary north-eastern Albania and southern Kosovo, had a Slavic Orthodox population which converted to Islam during the latter half of the eighteenth century due to the abolition of the Serbian Patriarchate of Peć (1766) and subsequent unstable ecclesiastical structures.

By the mid-19th century, because of the Tanzimat reforms started in 1839, which imposed mandatory military service on non-Muslims, the Orthodox Church lost adherents as the majority of Albanians had become Muslim.

=== Establishment of an authocephalous Albanian Orthodox Church ===
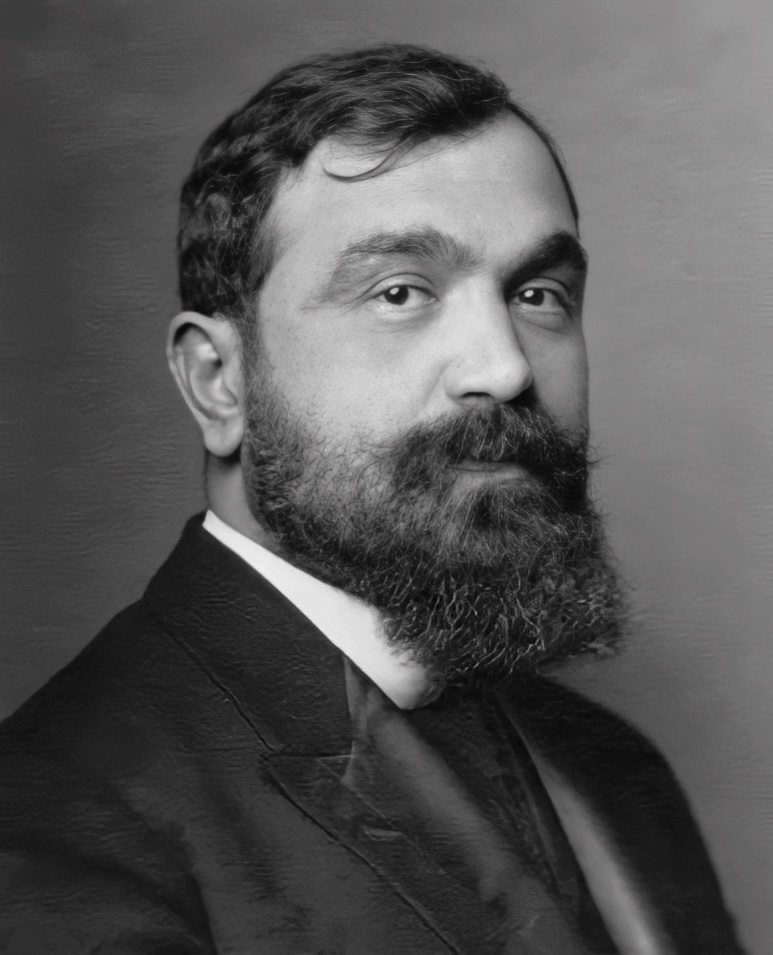
Bishop Fan Noli, founder of the Orthodox Autocephalous Church of Albania.

After Albanian independence in 1912, Noli (who in 1924 would also be a political figure and prime minister of Albania), traveled to Albania where he played an important role in establishing the Orthodox Albanian Church. On September 17, 1922, the first Orthodox Congress convened at Berat formally laid the foundations of an Albanian Orthodox Church and declared its autocephaly. The Ecumenical Patriarchate of Constantinople recognized the independence or autocephaly of the Orthodox Albanian Church in 1937.

=== Persecution of Orthodoxy under Communism ===
Hohxa propagated that Albania is threatened by religion in general, since it serves the "Trojan Horse" style interests of the country's traditional enemies; in particular Orthodoxy those of Greece and Serbia. In 1952 Archbishop Kristofor was discovered dead; most believed he had been killed.

In 1967 Hoxha closed down all churches and mosques in the country, and declared Albania the world's first atheist country. All expression of religion, public or private, was outlawed. Hundreds of priests and imams were killed or imprisoned.

=== Eastern Orthodoxy in Post-Communist Albania ===
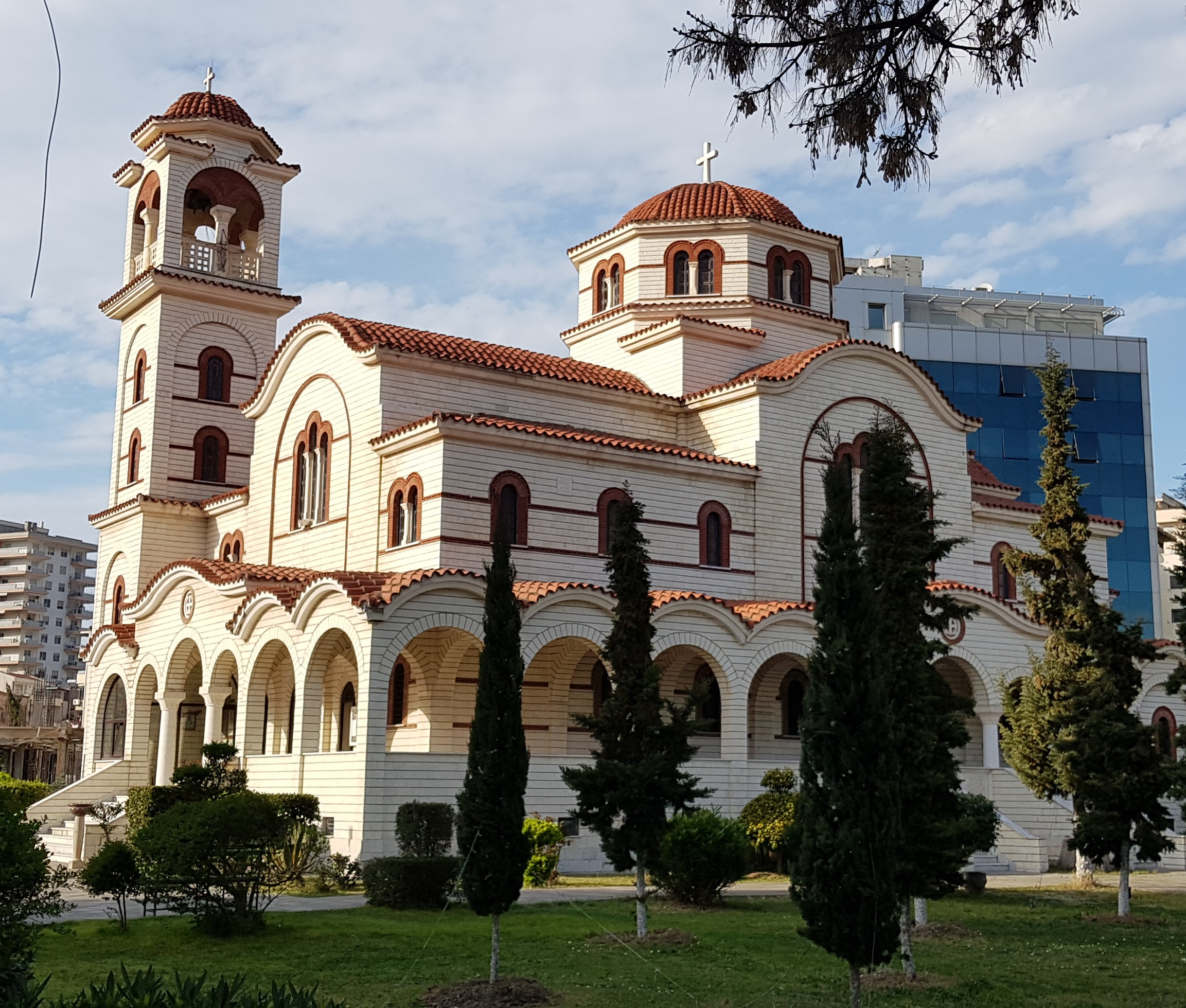
Saint Paul and Saint Astius Cathedral in Durrës, built 1994–2002.

In December 1990, Communist officials officially ended the 23 year long religious ban in Albania. Only 22 Orthodox priests remained alive. To deal with this situation, the Ecumenical Patriarch appointed Anastasios to be the Patriarchal Exarch for the Albanian Church. As Bishop of Androusa, Anastasios was dividing his time between his teaching duties at the University of Athens and the Archbishopric of Irinoupolis in Kenya, which was then going through a difficult patch, before his appointment. He was elected on June 24, 1992 and enthroned on August 2, 1992. Over time Anastasios has gained respect for his charity work and is now recognized as a spiritual leader of the Orthodox Church in Albania.

In 1992, Anastasios would use a disused hotel for initial liturgy services in Durrës. As of February 2011, there were 145 clergy members, all of which were Albanian citizens who graduated from the Resurrection of Christ Theological Academy. This academy is also preparing new members (men and women) for catechism and for other services in different Church activities.

Anastas’ domestic activities in Albania include the reconstruction of various Orthodox Churches which were confiscated by the communist authorities, the rebuilding of 150 churches, and the additional investments into schools & charities for the poor.

Another major introduction by Anastas was the Ngjalla radio station which preaches spiritual, educational, musical, and informative information about the religion.

During 1999, when Albania accepted waves of refugees from Kosovo, the Orthodox Autocephalous Church of Albania, in collaboration with donors and other international religious organizations (especially ACT and WCC), led an extensive humanitarian program of more than $12 million, hosting 33,000 Kosovars in its two camps, supplying them with food, clothes, medical care and other goods.

Apart from the two ecclesiastical high schools, it has established three elementary schools (1st – 9th grade), 17 day-care centers and two institutes for professional training (named "Spirit of Love", established in Tirana in 2000) which are said to be the first of their kind in Albania and provide education in the fields of Team Management, IT Accounting, Computer Science, Medical Laboratory, Restoration and Conservation of Artwork and Byzantine Iconography. In Gjirokastër, 1 professional school, the orphanage “The Orthodox Home of Hope”, a high school dormitory for girls, has also given technical and material support to many public schools.

An Office of Cultural Heritage was established to look after the Orthodox structures considered to be national cultural monuments. A number of choirs have been organized in the churches. A Byzantine choir has also been formed and has produced cassettes and CDs. A workshop for the restoration and painting of icons was established with the aim to train a new generation of artists, to revive the rich tradition of iconography. The Church has also sponsored important academic publications, documentary films, academic symposiums and various exhibits of iconography, codex, children’s projects and other culturally related themes.

The Orthodox Autocephalous Church of Albania actively participates as equals in the events of the Orthodox Church worldwide. It is a member of the Conference of the European Churches (of which the Archbishop Anastasios has served as vice-president since December 2003), the World Council of the Churches (of which Archbishop Anastasios was chosen as one of eight presidents in 2006), and the largest inter-faith organization in the world, "Religions for Peace" (of which Anastasios was chosen as Honorary President in 2006). It is also active in various ecumenical conferences and programs. The Orthodox Autocephalous Church of Albania contributes to the efforts for peaceful collaboration and solidarity in the region and beyond.

In 25 January 2025, Archbishop Janullatos died from health complications. His appointed successor, Archbishop Joan was elected as the new archbishop of the Albanian Orthodox Church on March 16, 2025.

== Controversies ==
=== Demolition and confiscation by state authorities ===
In August 2013, demonstrations took place by the Orthodox community of Përmet as a result of the confiscation of the Cathedral of the Assumption of the Virgin and the forcible removal of the clergy and of religious artifacts from the temple, by the state authorities. The Cathedral was allegedly not fully returned to the Orthodox Albania after the restoration of Democracy in the country. The incident provoked reactions by the Orthodox Church of Albania and also triggered diplomatic intervention from Greece.

=== Individuals ===
There is a widespread belief that the Orthodox faith is linked with conspiracy theories in which the identification with Greek expansionist plans would classify them as potential enemies of the state.

In early 2014 in a trip to the US, Archbishop Anastasios was met by protestors from the Albanian diaspora who oppose his position as head of the church due to him being from Greece. Whereas due to the Albanian Orthodox Church head and some bishops being from Greece, Fatos Klosi, former head of Albanian intelligence stated in an April 2014 media interview that the Albanian Orthodox Church is Greek controlled and no longer an Albanian institution. Klosi's comments were seen in Albania as controversial, rebuked by the church while it also sparked media discussion at the time.

The Albanian Orthodox Church created a new diocese in Elbasan on April 17, 2016. Its creation is opposed by Father Nikolla Marku who runs the local St Mary's church and who has broken ties with the Albanian Orthodox Church in the 1990s. The dispute has been ongoing as the Albanian Orthodox Church views Marku's tenure over the church as illegal. Marku's differences with the Orthodox church relate mainly to Anastasios Yannoulatos' being a Greek citizen heading the church in Albania with allegations that it has promoted divisions amongst the Orthodox community and Greek "chauvinism". Marku as a cause célèbre over the years has been portrayed by the Albanian media as a "rebel patriot". Nevertheless, he enjoys very limited support in Albania.

Orthodox Autocephalous Church opposed the legalisation of same-sex marriages for LGBT communities in Albania, as did the Muslim and Catholic Church leaders of the country.

== Demographics ==
=== Historical demographics ===
Although Islam is the dominant religion in Albania, in the southern regions, Orthodox Christianity was traditionally the prevailing religion before the declaration of Albanian independence (1913). However, their number decreased over the following years:

Year	Orthodox Christians	Muslims
1908	128,000	95,000
1923	114,000	109,000
1927	112,000	114,000

However, some of this decrease was accounted for by the changing of the boundaries of districts by the newly independent Albania. Additionally, the Orthodox Christians of Southern Albania had a greater tendency to migrate than their Muslim neighbors (at first, at least) in the early 20th century. Many of the Orthodox Albanians would ultimately return from the Western countries they emigrated to.

Around the fall of the Ottomon empire, as based on the late Ottoman census of 1908 and the Austrian-run Albanian census of 1918, the regions that retained the highest percentages of Orthodox Albanians, in some cases absolute majorities, were in the South (especially around Saranda, Gjirokastra, Përmeti, Leskoviku, Pogradeci and Korça) and the Myzeqe region of Central Albania (especially around Fier, where they formed a strong majority of the population). There were also large Albanian Orthodox populations in the regions of Elbasan and Berat. Contrary to the stereotype of only Tosks being Orthodox, Orthodox Albanians were also present in the North, where they were spread out at low frequencies in most regions. Orthodox Albanians reached large proportions in some Northern cities: Durrësi (36%), Kavaja (23%) and Elbasani (17%). Orthodox Albanians tended to live in either urban centers or in highland areas, but rarely in rural lowland areas (with the exception of in the region of Myzeqe).

=== 2011 census and reactions ===
In the 2011 census the declared religious affiliation of the population was: 56.7% Muslims, 13.79% undeclared, 10.03% Catholics, 6.75% Orthodox believers, 5.49% other, 2.5% Atheists, 2.09% Bektashis and 0.14% other Christians. However, the Orthodox Church of Albania officially rejected the specific results, claiming it was "totally incorrect and unacceptable".

Although the question regarding religion was optional, only to be answered by those who chose to, like the question about ethnic origin, it has become the central point of discussion and interest of this census.

The Albanian Orthodox church refused to recognize the results, saying they had drastically underrepresented the number of Orthodox Christians and noted various indications of this and ways it may have occurred. The Orthodox church claimed that from its own calculations, the Orthodox percentage should have been around 24%, rather than 6.75%.

In addition to boycotts of the census, Orthodox numbers may also be underrepresented because the census staff failed to contact a very large number of people in the south which is traditionally an Orthodox stronghold. Furthermore, The Orthodox Church said that according to a questionnaire it gave its followers during two Sunday liturgies in urban centers such as Durrësi, Berati and Korça, only 34% of its followers were actually contacted. There were other serious allegations about the conduct of the census workers that might have impacted on the 2011 census results. There were some reported cases where workers filled out the questionnaire about religion without even asking the participants or that the workers used pencils which were not allowed. In some cases communities declared that census workers never even contacted them. In addition to all these irregularities, the preliminary results released seemed to give widely different results, with 70% of respondents refusing to declare belief in any of the listed faiths, compared with only 2.5% of atheists and 13.8% undeclared in the final results. An Orthodox Albanian politician Dritan Prifti who at the time was a prominent MP for the Myzeqe region referred to fluctuating census numbers regarding the Orthodox community as being due to an "anti-Orthodox agenda" in Albania.

Orthodox Albanians were not the only ones to claim the census underrepresented their numbers: the Bektashi leadership also lambasted the results, which even more drastically reduced their representation down to 2%, and said it would conduct its own census to refute the results, while minority organizations of Greeks (mostly Orthodox) and Roma (mostly Muslim) also claimed they underrepresented, with the Greek organization Omonia arguing that this was linked to the under-representation of the Orthodox population.

According to the Council of Europe ("Third Opinion of the Council of Europe on Albania adopted 23.11.2011,") the population census "cannot be considered to be reliable and accurate, raises issues of compatibility with the principles enshrined in Article 3 of the Framework Convention…The Advisory Committee considers that the results of the census should be viewed with the utmost caution and calls on the authorities not to rely exclusively on the data on nationality collected during the census in determining its policy on the protection of national minorities."

Moreover, the World Council of Churches (WCC) general secretary Rev. Dr Olav Fykse Tveit has expressed concern at the methodology and results of the Albania Census 2011. He has raised questions in regard to the reliability of the process which, he said, has implications for the rights of religious minorities and religious freedoms guaranteed in the country's constitution. Tveit expressed this concern in letters issued at the beginning of May to the WCC president Archbishop Anastasios, to Prof. Dr Heiner Bielefeldt, United Nations Special Rapporteur on Freedom of Religion or Belief, and to the Albanian government.

=== Demographics in the early 2020s ===
According to the CIA World Factbook, Eastern Orthodox Christians made up 20% of the population of Albania. The 2023 census documented 7.23% of Albania’s population as being Eastern Orthodox Christians, a constant since 2011.

== Gallery ==
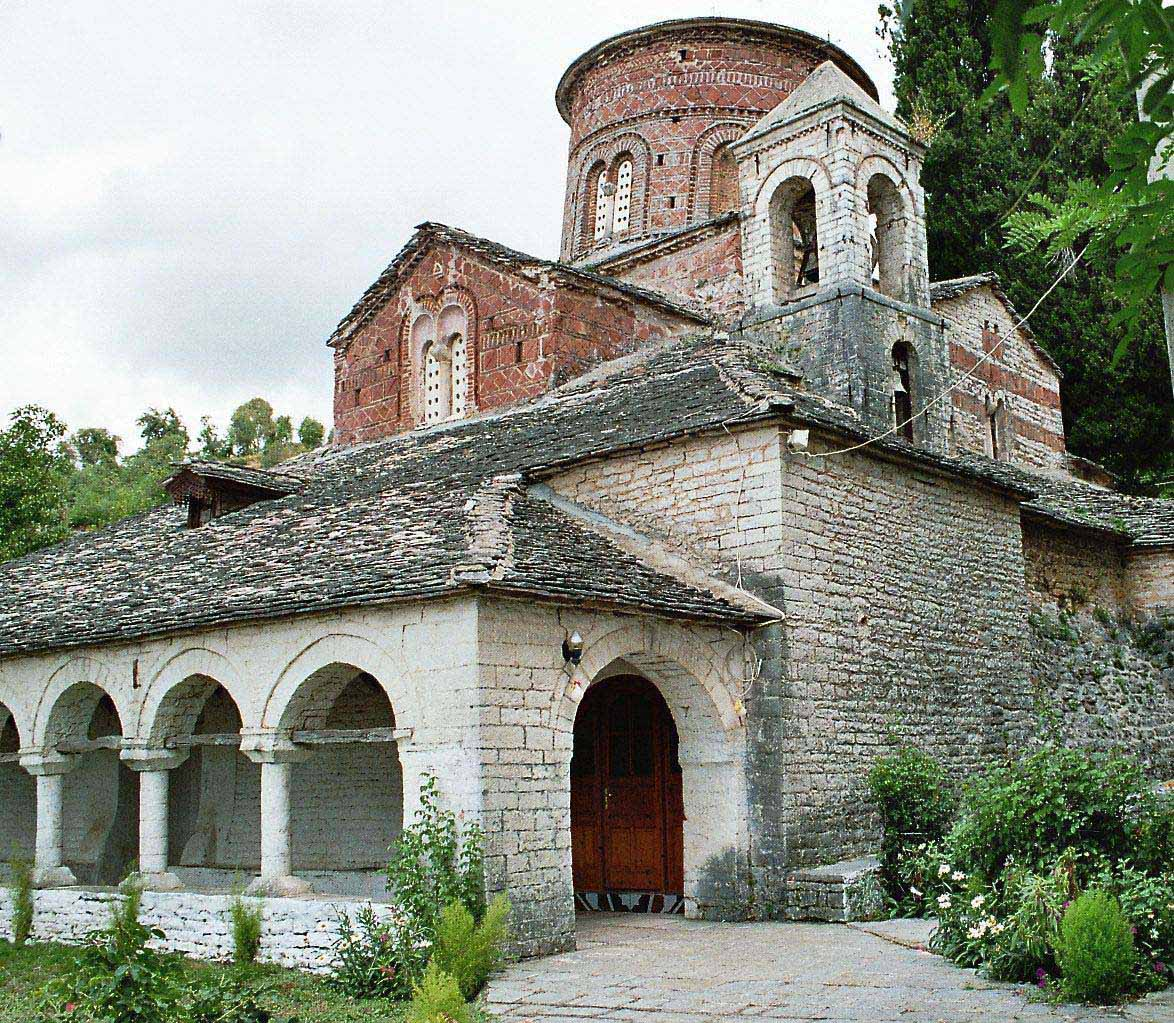
Dormition of the Theotokos Church, Labovë e Kryqit, Albania

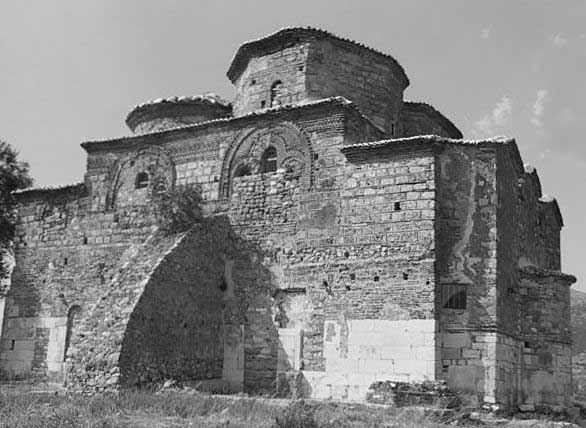
St. Nicholas' Monastery Church, Mesopotam, Albania

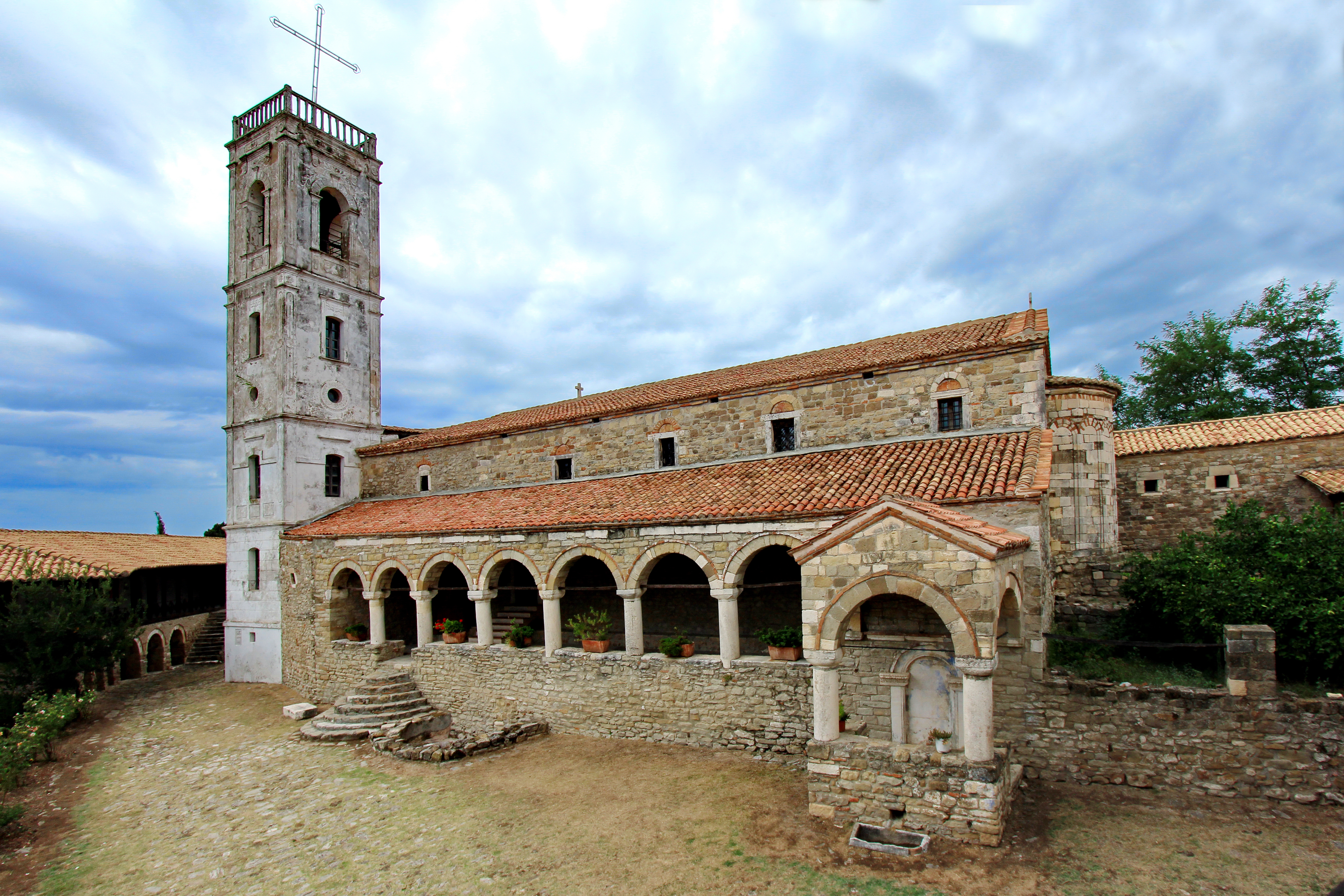
Ardenica Monastery, Ardenica, Albania

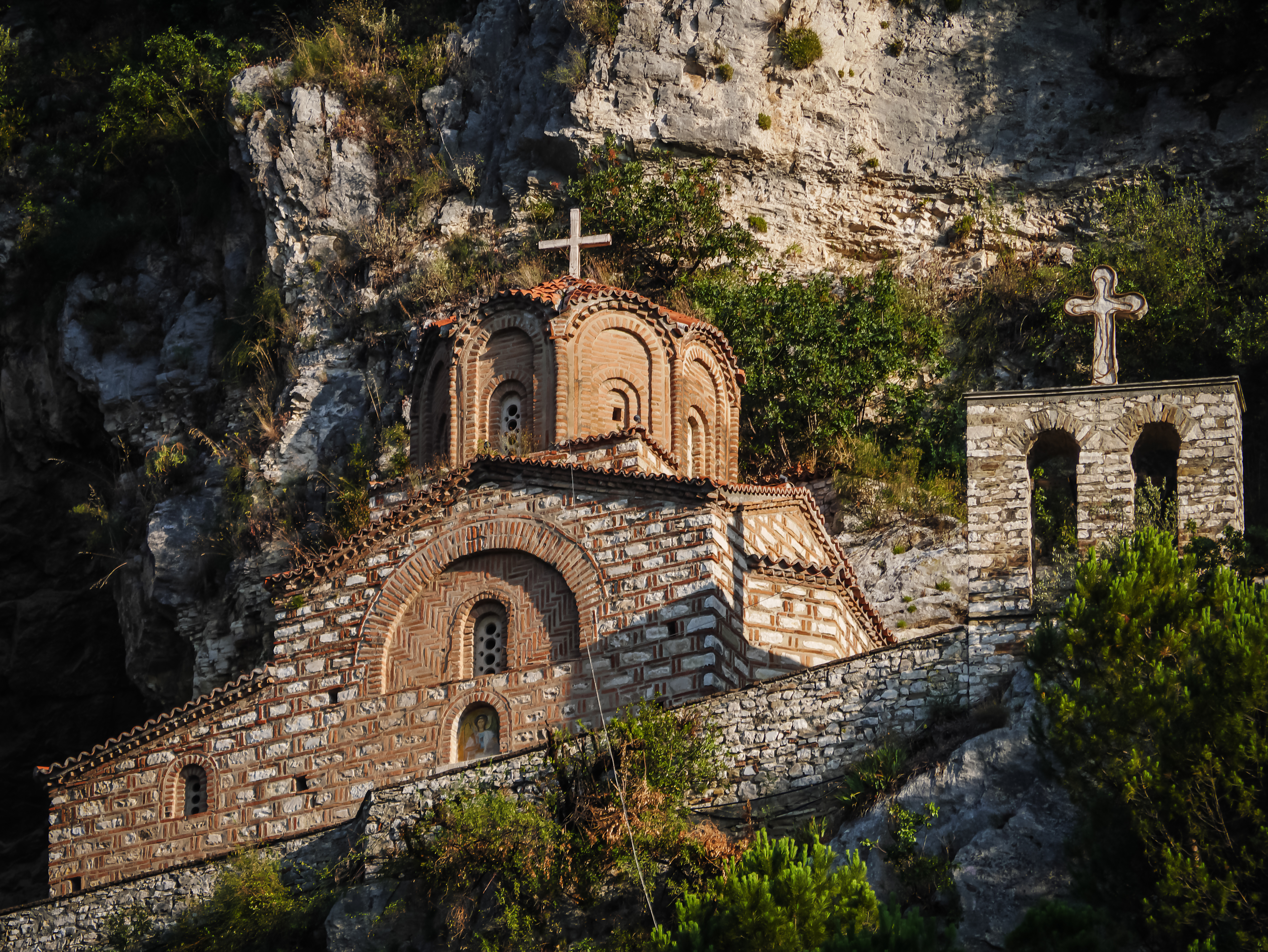
St. Michael's Church, Berat, Albania

== See also ==
- Religion in Albania
- Christianity in Albania
- Orthodox Autocephalous Church of Albania
- Archbishop Anastasios of Albania
- Albanian Byzantine Catholic Church
- Roman Catholicism in Albania
- Protestantism in Albania
- Irreligion in Albania
- Freedom of religion in Albania
