= Josif Pashko =

Albanian politician (1918–1963)

Personal details
- Born: 25 May 1918 Vodicë, Korçë, Albania
- Died: 5 September 1963 (aged 45) Tirana, Albania
- Party: Party of Labour of Albania

Josif Pashko (25 May 1918 - 5 September 1963) was an Albanian politician during the country's socialist period.

== Biography ==
Josif Pashko was born into a peasant family in the village of Vodica, Kolonja. In 1938, he graduated from the Normal School at Elbasan and served as an elementary school teacher in that town from 1939 to 1942. Together with his father Pashko Vodica, he joined the communist-led resistance to Italian occupation in 1942, becoming a political commissar of various brigades.

After the war, he was involved in the armed forces, security and judicial organs. From 1950 onwards, he was a deputy in the People's Assembly. From 1954 until his death, he was a government minister in charge of construction.

During the war, he joined the Communist Party of Albania (Party of Labour of Albania after 1948) and became a member of its Central Committee in 1952.

His son Gramoz Pashko was an economist who co-founded the Democratic Party of Albania in 1990.
