= St. Procopius Church (Tirana) =

18th-century church in Albania

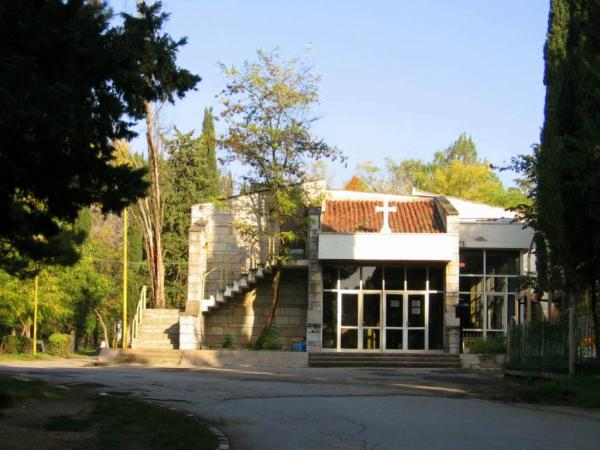
The small church of St. Procop, now demolished

St. Procopius Church (Albanian: Kisha e Shën Prokopit) is an Orthodox church on the outskirts of Tirana, Albania. Built by the Vlach community, it was one of two Orthodox churches that existed in the city before World War II, the other one being the 19th-century Greek Evangelismos Church, which was demolished in 1967.

== History ==
=== Old building ===
In 1787 the Bargjini family, feudals of Tirana and descendants of Sulejman Pasha, gave the permit to the Orthodox community of Tirana to construct the church, as a compensation for the protection that the community had offered in the local defense of the city against the attacks of Ahmet Kurt Pasha of Berat. The church was built in Ottoman times between 1790 and 1797 although in the church codex the donators of the construction can be traced only in a 1818 entry, as copies of the prior codex have been lost. A considerable part of the community were ethnic Vlachs and the codex, which included all the important activities of the church was written in Greek. The construction was half underground, whereas no bells were allowed, as was the law for newly constructed churches in Muslim countries. The church had dimensions of 22m long and 13m wide. The construction in 1874 of the Greek Orthodox Evangelismos Church, in the central plaza of Tirana (later demolished in 1967), entailed a smaller attendance to the St. Procopius Church.

=== Current building ===
In 1940 a new urbanistic plan for Tirana was approved. The Orthodox community of Tirana accepted moving the old church into a new building, which would be located at the Park of St. Procopius, around 25m over the level of the old one, and around 400m away from it. Kristofor Kisi, then primate of the Albanian Orthodox Church entrusted with the project of the new building Skënder Luarasi, a young architect who had graduated from the University of Vienna, and was son of patriot Kristo Luarasi. Ing Lucca & Co, Milano-Napoli was the company that built it, and the new church was ready in 1942, and inaugurated in 1945, right after World War II. In December 2017, Tirana Mayor Erion Veliaj announced a project to restore the church to its pre-1967 state. The remains of the old church were demolished and a concrete building which only resembles the old one has been built instead.

== Sources ==
- Beduli, Dhimitër (1997), Kodiku i Kishës së Shën Prokopit të Tiranës 1818-1922 (in Albanian), Kisha Orthodhokse Autoqefale e Shqipërisë
