= Eulogios Kourilas Lauriotis =

Albanian orthodox bishop and writer

His Eminence Bishop Eulogios
- Bishop of Korçë
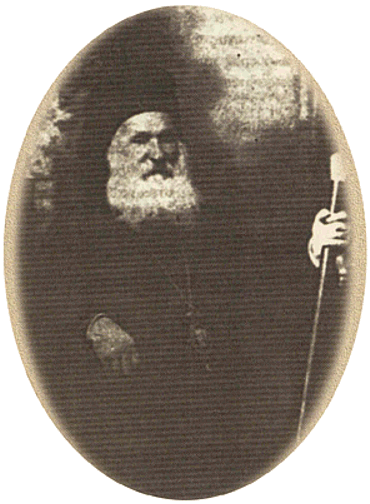
- In office: 1937-1939
- Predecessor: Christopher
- Successor: Agathangjel

Personal details
- Born: 1880 Ziçisht (Korçë), Ottoman Empire, now in modern Albania
- Died: 1961 (aged 80–81) Athens, Greece

Eulogios Kourilas Lauriotis (Greek: Ευλόγιος Κουρίλας Λαυριώτης; Albanian: Evlogji Kurilla) (Note: His family name is cited either in its Greek form "Kourilas" or "Kurilas" or in its Albanian form "Kurila". His first name can be found spelled "Eulogios" or "Evlogios" in Greek, "Evlogji" in Albanian, or sometimes "Eulogio" in English.) (1880–1961) was a bishop of the Orthodox Autocephalous Church of Albania. He was the Orthodox metropolitan bishop of Korçë in Albania between 1937 and 1939, and a professor of philosophy and author on religious matters. He later became one of the leaders of the Northern Epirus movement, propagating that Greece should annex southern Albania.

== Life ==
Evlogji Kurilla was born in the village of Ziçisht (then Ottoman Empire, today in Albania) in 1880. His ethnicity has been described as Albanian or Greek. He described himself as Greek and stated that his family originated from the settlement of Mount Gorilla in Greece, which his ancestors left at the beginning of the 19th century and settled in the wider area of Koritsa where they founded the village of Kurila. During his youth he was attracted by ascetic and monastic ideals and joined the monastic community of Mount Athos. He graduated from the local Athonite School (1901) and the Phanar Greek Orthodox College in Istanbul. He continued his studies in the Philosophy department of the University of Athens, where he acquired his Ph.D. in Humanities. He continued studies in Germany. Kourilas also participated in the Greek Struggle for Macedonia and during the Balkan Wars (1912–1913) he was in charge of 100 armed men, among them many priests, that fought for Greece in the area of Chalkidiki.

After an agreement with the Albanian authorities, in 1937, the Ecumenical Patriarchate chose a number of highly educated religious personalities for key positions in the recently declared as autocephalous Orthodox Church of Albania. Among them where Panteleimon Kotokos as metropolitan of Gjirokastër and Eulogios Kourilas as metropolitan of Korçë. When the communist regime of Enver Hoxha came to power in Albania in 1945, he was declared an "enemy of the state" and was deprived from the Albanian citizenship. By then he was already living in Greece where, parallel to his academic work, together with Panteleimon Kotokos became the heads of the Northern Epirus Central Committee propagating that parts of southern Albania, known among Greeks as Northern Epirus should be awarded to Greece. He became professor at School of Philosophy of the Aristotle University of Thessaloniki (1935–1937) and of the University of Athens (1942–1949).

He donated a significant part (10,000 volumes) of his library to the University of Ioannina.

He died in 1961, Stratonike, Chalkidiki.

== Works ==
Eulogios Kourilas wrote several historical, philosophical and theological books in Greek. His main works are (titles translated from Greek):

- History of Ascetism (1929)
- Catalogue of Kausokalyvia codices (1930)
- Albanian studies (1933)
- Gregorios Argyrokastritis (1935)
- Moschopolis and its New Academy (1935)
- Heraclea Sacra (1942) (title in Latin)
- Hellenism and Christianism (1944)
- Patriarchic History (1951).
