= Visarion Xhuvani =

Albanian bishop (1890–1965)

His Eminence Vissarion of Albania
- Archbishop of Albania
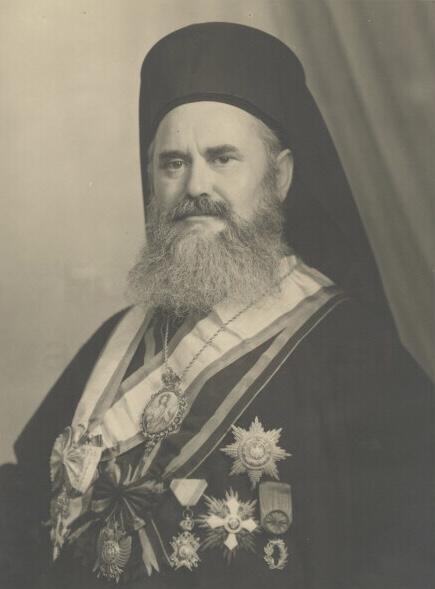
- Installed: 20 February 1929
- Term ended: 26 May 1937
- Predecessor: Theofan (as Metropolitan Dioceses of Durrës)
- Successor: Kristofor
- Other post: Bishop of Berat (1941-1947)

Personal details
- Born: Vissar Xhuvani; 14 December 1890 Elbasan, Albania (then Ottoman Empire)
- Died: 15 December 1965 (aged 75) Elbasan, Albania (then People's Republic of Albania)
- Education: Athens

Styles of The Archbishop of Tirana, Durrës and all Albania
- Reference style: His Beatitude
- Spoken style: Your Beatitude
- Religious style: Archbishop
- Posthumous style: N/A

Metropolitan Visarion Xhuvani (14 December 1890 – 15 December 1965) was the primate of the Orthodox Autocephalous Church of Albania from 1929 to 1937. He was a main contributor to the autocephaly, and a close collaborator of Fan Noli.

== Life ==
Visarion Xhuvani was born in the small Orthodox community in the "Kala" neighborhood of Elbasan, an old neighborhood inside the Elbasan Castle, in the Manastir Vilayet of the Ottoman Empire (present-day Albania). He was son of Joan and Efthimia, a member of the prominent Xhuvani family, the same as the scholar and linguist Aleksandër Xhuvani.

He finished the elementary school in his home town, following with Rizarios Hieratical School in Athens. He studied theology in Athens afterwards. From 1919 to 1923 he served in Sofia, and after that for a short time in Cetin.

Xhuvani participated in the Congress of Lushnjë, December 1920, being elected senator. He was a member of the Albanian parliament from 1919 to 1924. During this time he cooperated with Noli, emphasizing the need for an Authocephalus Orthodox church in Albania, strongly opposing the Patriarchate of Constantinople attempts to keep the Orthodox community under the Greek influence and prohibit the Albanian language from being used in all ceremonies. He was a main contributor in the Orthodox Congress of 1922, where the Autocephaly of the Albanian Orthodox Church was proclaimed.

Xhuvani proclaimed the autocephaly of the Albanian Orthodox Church during the Congress of Berat, in September 1922. At that time, despite Noli's attempts taking advantage even of his engagement in politics there was no success in consecrating Albanian bishops. As a result, the Albanian Church turned versus the Patriarchate of Peć which agreed to consecrate them instead. Xhuvani was consecrated bishop in Kotor, Kingdom of Slovenes, Croats, and Serbs from Russian Orthodox Church Outside Russia, residing in Sremski Karlovci. He kept good relations with the Serbian church and authorities.

The Patriarch of Constantinople declared that the process was invalid on their point of view. Xhuvani would take over after Noli's exile and continue on the same path with persistence. As a countermeasure to Greek pressure, the Albanians expelled the bishop Hierotheos and imprisoned the other bishop Kristofor in a monastery, both elected from Constantinople. The relations were frozen for some time due to Xhuvani's strong oppositions to granting any requests to the Greek side. He was considered "an obstacle for the agreement" even from the Albanian government. The Churches of Constantinople and the one of Moscow didn't recognize the Autocephaly, while the Serbian Orthodox Church and the Romanian one recognized it in silence.

Xhuvani was elected Primate of OACA in 1929, where King Zog pushed the Autochephaly as a priority of his state. Despite the contradictions, Xhuvani served until 1937, the Church of Constantinople recognized the OACA, adding Xhuvani's removal as an ultimate condition. Xhuvani was forced to resign and was succeeded by Kristofor Kisi. Fan Noli would recall him as one of the most energetic clerics of Albania. Beside Albanian, Xhuvani knew English, German, Romanian, Serbo-Croatian, Italian, and Old and New Greek languages. He has translated several theological studies into Albanian. He was the promoter of the Kristoforidhi's monument in the main plaza of Elbasan.

Xhuvani started new negotiations with the Patriarchana in 1935, in order to obtain recognition. The negotiations finalized in 1937 with the recognition of the Autocepalic Church of Albania by Patriarch Benjamin I of Constantinople. The Albanian side proposed Kristofor Kisi, as primate of the church, while the Greek side proposed Eulogios Kourilas, an Albanian from Ziçisht with a very strong pro-Greek background. The delegation from Albanian government (including Koço Kota and Josif Kedhi) agreed on Kurilla's and Kotokos' presence under Kisi's hierarchy, in contradiction with what Xhuvani insisted. Xhuvani was constrained to resign but continued serving the Orthodox church in Albania.

After the Italian invasion of Albania, he was part of the delegation which carried the Albanian throne to Victor Emanuel IIl in Rome. He was also elected member of the Constitutional Assembly of 1939. During World War II he helped Jewish families by providing fake documents of Albanian nationality and citizenship while serving as Bishop of Berat.

He was arrested by the Communists and imprisoned in 1946, condemned to 20 years on 22 December 1947, and released in 1963. He died in Elbasan in 1965. He was initially buried in the St. Jovan Vladimir's Church in the nearby village of Shijon, being displaced later into the village's community cemetery.

== See also ==
- Christianity in Albania
- Albania–Greece relations
- Fan Noli

== Literature ==
- Bido, Ardit (2020), The Albanian Orthodox Church: A Political History, 1878–1945, Routledge
