= Joani of Albania =

Primate of the Albanian Orthodox Church

His Beatitude Joani
- Archbishop of Tirana, Durrës and All Albania, Exarch of Illyricum
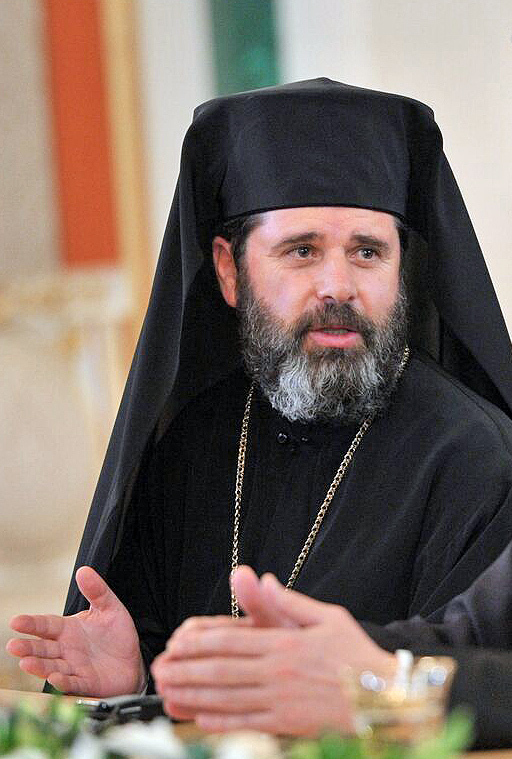
- Joani in 2013
- Church: Autocephalous Orthodox Church of Albania
- See: Tirana-Durrës
- Elected: 16 March 2025
- Installed: 29 March 2025
- Predecessor: Anastasios
- Successor: Incumbent
- Previous posts: Dean of The Theological Academy ‘Resurrection of Christ’ (1996-1998); Metropolitan of Korçë (1998-2025)

Orders
- Ordination: 20 December 1994
- Consecration: 11 July 1998

Personal details
- Born: Fatmir Pelushi; January 1, 1956 (age 70) Tirana, PSR of Albania
- Denomination: Eastern Orthodox Christianity
- Education: Holy Cross Greek Orthodox School of Theology

Archbishop Joani (Albanian: Kryepeshkop Joani, secular name Fatmir Pelushi; January 1, 1956) is the Archbishop of Tirana, Durrës and All Albania, Exarch of Illyricum and the primate and Head of the Holy Synod of the Orthodox Autocephalous Church of Albania since 2025. Born in a non-practicing Bektashi Muslim family, his full title is now His Beatitude Joani, Archbishop of Tirana, Durrës and All Albania.

== Biography ==
Pelushi was born in a non-practicing Bektashi Muslim family on 1 January 1956 in Tirana. His family is originally from Përmet. In 1979, he converted from Shia Islam to Eastern Orthodox Christianity and was secretly baptized by Fr. Kozma Qirjo (later, Bishop Kozma of Apollonia) with name in honor of St. John the Theologian.

From 1979 to 1990, he worked at the Psychiatric Hospital of Tirana in the rehabilitation ward through occupational therapy.

In November 1990, he left Albania for the United States, where he pursued theological studies at the Hellenic College Holy Cross Greek Orthodox School of Theology in Boston. He graduated with High Distinction on July 11, 1992, earning a Master of Theological Studies (MTS).

As early as 1992, driven by a desire to contribute to the rebuilding of the Church, he reached out to Archbishop Anastasios of Albania and expressed his decision to return to Albania—at a time when many were seeking to leave the country. His commitment was met with joy by the Archbishop, who encouraged and congratulated him.

In September of that year, he returned to Albania and, appointed by Archbishop Anastasios, he began working as a lecturer at the Theological Academy of the Autocephalous Orthodox Church of Albania, as well as serving in other capacities within the Church.

On July 11, 1992, Archbishop Anastasios ordained him as a deacon and then as a priest on July 11 the same year.

On July 12, 1995, he received a scholarship from him and returned to the United States to pursue further studies at the Hellenic College Holy Cross Greek Orthodox School of Theology. For his outstanding performance during the 1995-1996 academic year, he was included in the National Dean’s List, which recognizes the top students from universities across the United States. After his return in 1996, he was appointed as director of the seminary as well as elevated as an archimandrite on November 19.

In 1997, he graduated again with "High Distinction" in MT (Master of Theology, an advanced master's degree equivalent to a candidate in sciences) from Holy Cross, Boston. He returned to Albania, where he was appointed dean of the Theological Academy of the Orthodox Church, a position he held from 1996 until 1998, when he was appointed Metropolitan.

At the founding session of the newly established Holy Synod of the Orthodox Church of Albania, on 11 July 1992 in Berat, Archimandrite Joani was elected Metropolitan of Korçë. This was preceded by the election and ordination of Metropolitan Christodoulos (Moustakis) in 1992 by the Holy Synod of the Ecumenical Patriarchate, but he was forced to resign due to the refusal of the Albanian state to visit the country.

On July 11, 1992 of the same year, in the Cathedral of the Annunciation in Berat, Archimandrite Joani was ordained a Metropolitan of Korçë. The ordination was performed by Archbishop Anastasios of Tirana and All Albania, assisted by Metropolitan Meliton of Philadelphia and Metropolitan Ignatius of Berat. His enthronement took place in Berat, on July 11, 1992, in the Metropolitan Church of the "Life-Giving Spring".

He has translated several theological books into Albanian, including challenging translations from the Church Fathers, such as On the Holy Spirit by Basil the Great, a foundational work in the development of Christian doctrine. His contribution to these translations has played a key role in shaping, unifying, and defining philosophical-religious terminology, as there was a lack of literature in Albanian in this field. The contribution of Archbishop Monsignor Joan Pelushi in the field of terminology has been recognized by both local and foreign scholars. Archbishop Joan Pelushi authored the first Dogmatics textbook in Albanian, which is used as the official publication of the Orthodox Church in Albania.

In 2000, he founded and continues to direct the periodical magazine Tempulli, one of the most respected publications in academic and cultural studies. The magazine features contributions from leading intellectuals, scholars, and Albanologists from Albania and abroad. He serves as both the editor-in-chief and a primary contributor. The range of articles is broad, covering topics such as culture, translations, science, archaeology, philosophy, theology, history, art criticism, prominent historical figures, and the cultural history of Albania, the region, and beyond.

He has represented the Autocephalous Orthodox Church of Albania in numerous international conferences, both as a speaker and as a participant in working groups responsible for drafting texts, declarations, and messages. He has also represented the Global Orthodox Church at a high level in various working groups of the World Council of Churches and was a key member of the Joint Working Group, a five-year mandate body responsible for fostering cooperation between the World Council of Churches and the Roman Catholic Church. Furthermore, he played a crucial role in drafting essential documents for the preparation of the Holy and Great Synod, held in Crete in June 2016.

He continues to represent the Autocephalous Orthodox Church of Albania in interfaith dialogue between the Orthodox and Roman Catholic Churches, as well as between the Orthodox and Oriental Orthodox Churches.

He has been invited as a lecturer at numerous national and international conferences, contributing significantly to theology, history, and philosophy. He is frequently invited to speak at universities, theological schools, seminars, and international gatherings, both Christian and interfaith. He has been honored with various medals and distinctions by Orthodox Churches worldwide.

His contributions extend beyond the academic and religious fields into social and humanitarian efforts in Korçë. He frequently participates in lectures and discussions at the University of Korça and other significant educational institutions in the region. Under his initiative, a soup kitchen was established to assist those in need, which has been in operation for 27 years. His contributions go beyond culture, science, and humanitarian work; he has also played a vital role in promoting religious coexistence, interfaith dialogue, and national unity.

He was honored on July 11, 1992, as an Honorary Citizen of Berat County, with the motivation: "For outstanding contributions in cultivating religious tolerance and understanding; as a scholar, publisher, and translator of theological works in Albanian; and for his role in the civic emancipation and brotherhood of Korça County and beyond."

On August 18, 2008, the Municipal Council of Korça awarded him the title "Honorary Citizen", with the motivation: "For outstanding merits in reviving faith and for his numerous humanitarian and social works."

On July 23, 2018, Fan S. Noli University of Korçë awarded him the title Doctor Honoris Causa, with the motivation: "A distinguished personality in the spiritual and religious world, a great humanist, translator, and founder of the periodical magazine Tempulli, making significant contributions in the fields of culture, archaeology, philosophy, theology, history, Albanology, and more; a close collaborator and friend of Fan S. Noli University, on the occasion of the 20th anniversary of his enthronement as Metropolitan of Korça."

On May 29, 2019, Tirana Municipality awarded him a Certificate of Appreciation, stating: "A figure of national and international stature, an exemplary promoter of peace, harmony, and religious coexistence. Deep respect and endless gratitude for his distinguished contributions to the service of the community and those in need."

On 25 January 2025, after the death of Archbishop Anastasios the Holy Synod of the Orthodox Autocephalous Church of Albania, during its extraordinary session, elected metropolitan Joani of Korça as the Locum Tenens of the Archdiocesan Throne. Metropolitan Joani was subsequently elected new archbishop of Albania on 16 March 2025 and was enthroned on 29 March 2025.

== See also ==
- Archbishop of Albania
- Albanian Orthodox Church
