= Ziçisht =

Village in Devoll, region Korçë, Albania

- Village
- Location within Albania
- Coordinates: 40°33′27″N 20°55′27″E
- Country: Albania
- County: Korçë
- Municipality: Devoll
- Administrative unit: Miras
- Time zone: UTC+1 (CET)
  - Summer (DST): UTC+2 (CEST)

Ziçisht is a settlement in the Korçë County, southeastern Albania. It is part of the former municipality Miras. At the 2015 local government reform it became part of the municipality Devoll.

During the Macedonian struggle, Nikolaos Dailakis, a Greek revolutionary was active in some Albanian speaking villages such as Ziçisht and Sinicë.

== Notable people ==
- Bishop Eulogios (Kourilas) of Korçë (1880–1961) Orthodox bishop.
- Kostë Çekrezi, nationalist figure, historian, and publisher
- Petraq Zoto, writer
- Mihallaq Ziçishti, former Vice Minister of the Interior until 1982, known for the grotesque defense of himself in the Communist trial, that saved him the life.
