= Congress of Berat =

The Congress of Berat, also known as the Albanian Orthodox Congress, was a meeting held on 13 September 1922, in Berat, Albania, among Albanian Orthodox faithful. The congress decided the autocephaly of the Church of Albania. According to the decisions of the Congress, religious services could be held in the Albanian language.

== History ==
=== Preparations for Autocephaly ===
During the years after the Independence of Albania, which had been proclaimed in 1912, all the leaders of the Albanian ecclesiastical movement were also prominent politicians. Both Visarion Xhuvani and Fan Noli were high ranking clerics, as well as members of the Parliament of Albania. During this period the orthodox believers of central Albania had begun addressing Archimandrite Visarion as "His Grace", a title used only for bishops. On 28 November 1921, on the 9th anniversary of Albanian independence, Visarion held a liturgy, which was attended by the highest officials of the country, he announced the decision to establish a self-governing National Orthodox Church of Albania, and to call a national congress to establish the national church. All the orthodox faithful, attending the liturgy, supported the resolution. The following day the Albanian government released a declaration endorsing the autocephaly of the Albanian Orthodox Church. 11 days later, on 9 December 1921 Theophan Noli, then the only Albanian bishop, arrived in Korçë, where he announced that he would continue his path for the consolidation of the Orthodox Church.

The primary purpose of the congress was to convince the Patriarchate of Constantinople to recognize the autocephaly, and the presence of self-proclaimed bishops might undermine this effort, while there was competition between Xhuvani, representing the faithful of central Albania, and Noli, representing the faithful of Southeastern Albania, as to who would be the future primate of the newly built autocephalous church. The Albanian government openly supported Xhuvani, who had under his influence the areas of Durrës, Dibër, and Shkodër, whereas Noli was backed up by Korçë, Bilisht, Leskovik, and Përmet, and also had the support of the Vatra, the Pan-Albanian Federation of America. The areas of Tirana, Kavajë, Berat, Fier, Lushnje, Libohovë, and Delvina, had still to take sides before the congress.

=== Congress Organization ===
The initiative for the congress was taken by the mayor of Durrës, Kostë Paftali, who had the goal to unite the Orthodox Albanians and sent telegrams to the Orthodox circles all over the country. Every district elected two delegates. On 10 September 1922 in the main school of Berat the delegate gathered and presented their credentials. A special committee who verified their credentials was headed by Perikli Kone, secretary Vasil Llapushi and members Vangjel Çamçe, Stathi Kondi and Taq Buda. The following were the delegates:

- Korçë – Ikonom Papa Josifi and Dhori Havjari
- Pogradec – Father Vasil Marko and Thanas P. Kërxhalli
- Bilisht – Father Josif and Anastas Çekrezi
- Kolonjë – Hermit Sofroni and Dhimitër P. Nini
- Leskovik – Father Vangjel Çamçe and Thanas Prifti
- Berat – Perikli Kona and Dhimitër Tutulani
- Fier – Loni Xhoxha and Dhimitër Qilica
- Durrës – Visarion Xhuvani and Gjergji Manushi
- Përmet – Dr. Kondi and Vasil Kota
- Vlorë – Tol Arapi and Jani Serani
- Lushnjë – Tun Gjergji and Llazar Bozo
- Kavajë – Pal Xhumari and Andrea Ikonomi
- Tirana – Papa Simoni and Mark Hobdari
- Elbasan – Vasil Llapushi and Simon Shuteriqi
- Shpat – Taq Buda and Dhimitër Paparisto
- Dibër – Leonidha Nishku and Kostë Paftali
- Libohovë – Spiro Kati

The congress started its work on 11 September 1922 at the Mangalem quarter of the city of Berat. First it elected unanimously Josif Qirici as the congress' chairperson. Subsequently Reverend Vasil Marko from Pogradec held an effective speech, in which he described the ecclesiastical battle as a national imperative. After Marko's speech, Archimandrite Visarion Xhuvani took the floor and declared the Church's autocephaly. The declaration of the autocephaly meant that the church of Albania was already de facto autocephalous, and the congress was declaring its autocephalous state, whereas the recognition from the Patriarchana would come later. The declaration of autocephaly meant that the Church of Albania would now establish a Church High Council and elect its own bishop, who would constitute the Holy Synod and run the church. In addition, the congress decided that the seat of the Albanian Autocephalous Church would be Korçë, citing its venerable ecclesiastical history.

While no one objected to the autocephaly, the majority of the representatives turned against Visarion Xhuvani, accused of a megalomaniac attitude, which led to the election of Reverend Vasil Marko as the chair of the Church's High Council, rather than Xhuvani. The High Council was composed of eight other members, one clergyman and one layman from each diocese. The following were the members elected:

- Diocese of Korçë – Josif Qirici, clergy; Dhosi Havjari, layman
- Diocese of Durrës – Visarion Xhuvani as metropolitan, however he would be ordained as bishop as soon as two other bishops would be ordained; Simon Shuteriqi, layman
- Diocese of Berat – Reverend Anastas, clergy; Tol Arapi, layman
- Diocese of Gjirokastër – Reverend Pano, clergy; Stathi Kondi, layman

On 17 September 1922 the congress compiled the statute of the Albanian Orthodox Church, based on the initial Visarion Xhuvani's draft. The statute stipulated that the Church of Albania would be inseparable from the Universal Apostolic Orthodox Church. A metropolitan would lead the church, which would comprise five dioceses. Four of them would be bishoprics and the only metropolis would be the newly created metropolis of Tirana. The four clergymen elected as members of the High Council would comprise the Holy Synod, however, given that during the time of the congress not all High Council clergymen were bishops, the entire High Council would execute the functions of the Holy Synod for the time being.

== Reaction from the Ecumenical Patriarch of Constantinople ==
Meletius IV of Constantinople sent a Patriarchal exarch to Albania, Bishop Hierotheos of Miletopolis, who arrived in Korçë on 27 November 1922. On 19 December 1922, he sent a letter to the newly created synod, congratulating them for the initiative and expressing his faith that the Ecumenical Patriarchate will, in due time, recognize the Albanian Orthodox Church. Hierotheos wrote a report for Meletius IV and proposed that an Albanian delegation be invited to Istanbul. The delegation, headed by Vasil Marku, went to Istanbul in March 1923, but could not obtain a promise for full recognition, as Patriarch Meletius IV would give only a partial autonomy, and that would have been contrary to the provisions of the statute. On 23 August 1923 Metropolite Kristofor Kisi volunteered to serve the Albanian Orthodox Church.

== Literature ==
- Bido, Ardit (2020), The Albanian Orthodox Church: A Political History, 1878–1945, Routledge, ISBN 9780429755477
- Llukani, Andrea (2010), Krishterimi ne Shqiperi, Trifon Xhagjika
