= Archbishop of Albania =

Primate of the Orthodox Autocephalous Church of Albania

Archbishop of Tirana, Durrës and all Albania of the Orthodox Autocephalous Church of Albania
- Archbishopric

Eastern Orthodox
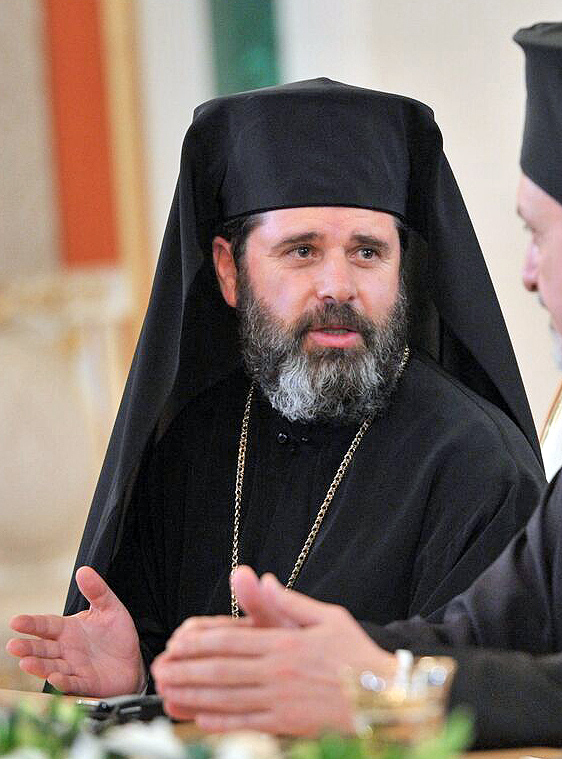

- Coat of arms
- Incumbent: Joani; 16 March 2025
- Style: His Beatitude

Information
- First holder: Vissarion
- Established: 17 September 1922
- Cathedral: Resurrection Cathedral, Tirana, Albania

Website
- orthodoxalbania.org

Styles of The Archbishop of Tirana, Durrës and all Albania
- Reference style: His Beatitude
- Spoken style: Your Beatitude
- Religious style: Archbishop
- Posthumous style: N/A

Archbishop of Tirana, Durrës and All Albania or simply Archbishop of Albania (Albanian: Kryepeshkopi i Tiranës, Durrësit dhe gjithë Shqipërisë) is the primate of the Orthodox Autocephalous Church of Albania. He is also head of the Holy Synod.

== List of Archbishops of Albania ==
No.	Primate	Portrait	Reign			Notes
1	Vissarion		20 February 1929	26 May 1937	8 years, 3 months and 6 days	Born on 14 December 1890 in Elbasan.
2	Kristofor; Kryepeshkopi Kristofori i Shqipërisë (Sotir Kisi)		12 April 1937	25 August 1949	12 years, 4 months and 13 days	Born in 1881 in Berat.
3	Paisi; Kryepeshkop Paisi (Pashko Vodica)		25 August 1949	4 March 1966	16 years, 6 months and 7 days	Born in 1881 in Vodicë, Kolonjë.
4	Damian; Kryepeshkopi Damian (Dhimitër Kokoneshi)		7 March 1966	8 October 1973	7 years, 7 months and 1 day	Born on 26 October 1886 in Llëngë, Mokër.
5	Anastasi; Kryepeshkopi Anastas (Anastas Janullatos)		11 July 1992	25 January 2025	32 years, 7 months and 14 days	Born on 4 November 1929 in Piraeus.
6	Joani; Kryepeshkopi Joan (Fatmir Pelushi)		16 March 2025	Incumbent	10 months and 3 days	Born on 1 January 1956 in Tirana.

== Sources ==
- Bido, Ardit (2020). The Albanian Orthodox Church: A Political History, 1878–1945. London: Routledge.
- Kiminas, Demetrius (2009). The Ecumenical Patriarchate: A History of Its Metropolitanates with Annotated Hierarch Catalogs. Wildside Press LLC.
