= Anastasios of Albania =

Albanian Orthodox bishop (1929–2025)

His Beatitude Anastasios
- Archbishop of Tirana, Durrës and All Albania
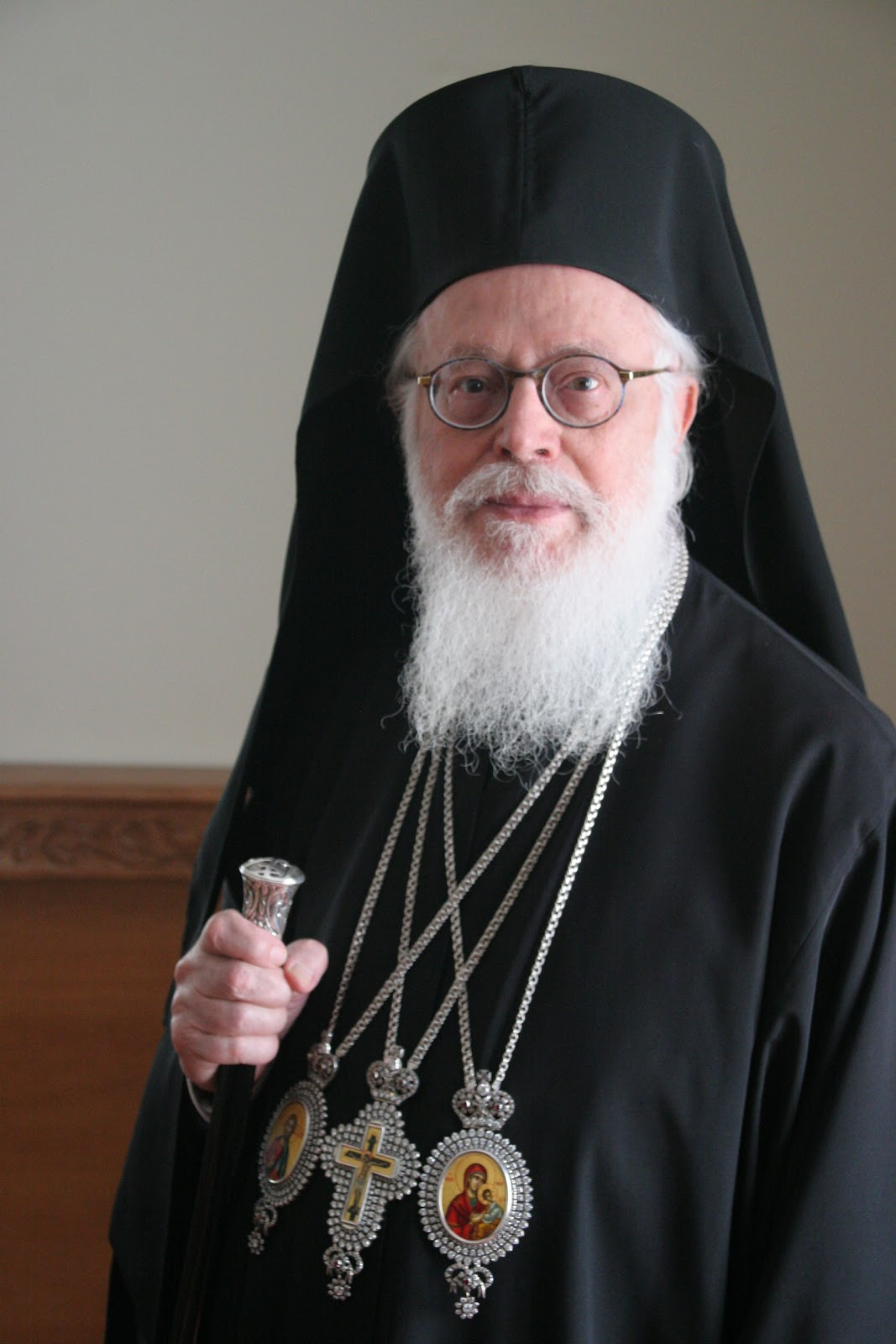
- Native name: Αναστάσιος Γιαννουλάτος
- Church: Autocephalous Orthodox Church of Albania
- See: Tirana-Durrës
- Installed: 24 June 1992
- Term ended: 25 January 2025
- Predecessor: Damian (1974)
- Successor: John

Orders
- Ordination: 24 May 1964
- Consecration: 19 November 1972

Personal details
- Born: Anastasios Yannoulatos; 4 November 1929 Piraeus, Greece
- Died: 25 January 2025 (aged 95) Athens, Greece
- Buried: Resurrection Cathedral, Tirana
- Denomination: Eastern Orthodox Christianity
- Education: University of Athens; University of Hamburg; University of Marburg; Makerere University
- Signature: Anastasios's signature

Archbishop Anastasios (Note: His full title was His Beatitude Anastasios, Archbishop of Tirana, Durrës and All Albania.) (Secular name: Anastasios Yannoulatos; Greek: Αναστάσιος Γιαννουλάτος; Albanian: Anastas Janullatos; 4 November 1929 – 25 January 2025), was the Archbishop of Tirana, Durrës and All Albania and as such the primate and Head of the Holy Synod of the Autocephalous Orthodox Church of Albania. He was elected in June 1992. He was Professor Emeritus of the National University of Athens and an honorary member of the Academy of Athens. Anastasios was one of the presidents of the Central Committee of the World Council of Churches. He was also the honorary president of the World Conference of Religions for Peace.

== Life and career ==
Anastasios was born in Piraeus, Greece. His paternal grandfather was from Asos, Cephalonia, and moved to Lefkada during the middle of the 19th century. On 24 December 2017, he became an Albanian citizen. He was the head of the Autocephalous Orthodox Church of Albania. His work included charity in Africa in his early years prior to becoming the Archbishop of Albania.

=== Education ===
Anastasios obtained a Certificate of High School with High Honours in 1947, a Bachelor of Divinity from the National University of Athens with High Honors (1952), and carried out post-graduate studies in the History of Religions, Ethnology, Missions, and Africanology at the Universities of Hamburg and Marburg. He undertook research at Makerere University College (1965–69) under the German Foundation Alexander von Humboldt. Th.D. of the Theological Faculty of the National University of Athens (1970, Summa cum laude). During his military service (1952–54) he attended the Schools of the Army Reserve Officers of Syros and of the Signal Corps of Chaidari (to both first in rank and chief of School). He studied various religions, including Hinduism, Buddhism, Taoism, Confucianism, African religions, Islam.

=== Church ministry ===
Anastasios was ordained as a deacon on 7 August 1960; as a priest on 24 May 1964; and as Bishop of Androusa for the position of the General Director of Apostoliki Diakonia of the Church of Greece on 19 November 1972. He was acting archbishop of the Holy Archbishopric of Irinoupolis (Kenya, Uganda, Tanzania) from 1981 through 1991 and the Patriarchal Exarch in Albania from January 1991 through June 1992. He was Metropolitan of Androussa from August 1991 through June 1992 and Archbishop of Tirana, Durrës and Primate of Albania from 24 June 1992 until his death.

After the 2019 Albania earthquake, the primate of the Orthodox Church of Albania received a letter of solidarity from Reverend Olav Fykse Tveit on behalf of the WCC, which affirms that "the poignant images of devastation and destruction grieve us greatly, as do the accounts of families left destitute by this event, especially as winter fast approaches". It concluded with the WCC asking him "to share our message of support and condolence with Christians and with all people of good will in Albania, including religious communities of other faiths with whom you work so closely."

Anastasios has been praised for reestablishing the Church of Albania and for his social work. He has also been praised as a bridge-builder between Greece and Albania and a moderate, but criticized by Albanian nationalists.

=== Scientific career ===
- Lehrbeauftragte, for teaching modern-Greek language and philology – University of Marburg, Germany (1966–69). He organized and directed the «Center of Missionary Studies» at the University of Athens (1971–76).
- Associate Professor of History of Religions (1972–76).
- Full Professor of History of Religions in the National University of Athens (1976–97). Prof. Emeritus (1997 ff.).
- At the same university: Director of the Department of the Science of Religions and Sociology (1983–86).
- Dean of the Theological Faculty and member of the Senate (1983–86).
- Vice-president of the Club of Students.
- Chairman of the Commission of Solidarity in the Cyprian Struggle (1975–84).
- Member of the Committee of Research of the University of Athens (1986–1990). and the «Inter-Orthodox Center of Athens» of the Church Greece (1971–75).
- Member of the Council of the Centre of Mediterranean and Arabic Studies (1978–82).
- ThD h.c. of:
  - The Theological School of the Holy Cross, Brookline, Ma, USA (1989)
  - The Theological Faculty of the Aristotle University of Thessaloniki (1995)
  - St. Vladimir's Orthodox Theological Seminary (2003)
  - The Theological School of the Craiova University (2006)
  - The Theological Faculty of the Pontifical University of South Italy (2009)
- Honorary Member of the Moscow Theological Academy (1998)
- D. Staniloae Diploma Univ. Bucharest (the highest theological distinction of this university) (2003).
- PhD h.c. of:
  - The Department of History and Archaeology of the Philosophical Faculty of the University of Ioannina (1996)
  - The Agricultural University of Athens (1996)
  - The Department of Political Science and Public Administration of the Law, Economic and Political Sciences and all the Departments of the Philosophical Faculty of the National University of Athens (1998);
  - The Department of International and European Studies of the University of Piraeus (2001)
  - The Department of Philology of the University of Crete (2002)
  - The Departments of Physics, Medicine, Primary Education and Civic Engineers of the University of Patras (2002)
- Doctor of Humane Letters of:
  - Boston University (2004)
  - The Departments of Medical and Agricultural of University of Thesalia, and Golden Medal of this university (2005)
  - The History Department of the Ionian University, Corfu (2007)
  - The University of Korça (2008)
  - The Departments of History and Ethnology as well as of Languages and Culture of Thrace's Dimokriteian University (2009)
  - The University of Cyprus (2010).

=== Church and social work ===
- Lay preacher, catechetical work with teenagers; responsible for Bible studies, students camps, missionary efforts in new social frontiers. (1954–60).
- Founder and director of the Inter-Orthodox Missionary Centre «Porefthendes» (1961 ff.). He organized and directed (1971–74) the Inter-Orthodox Centre of the Church of Greece; during his term of office there dozens of Conferences, Seminars and other Church and social activities were organized. During his post-graduate studies in Germany he ministered to the emigrant Greek workers and students.

He has been a member of:

- The council: of the High School of Social Work – Deaconesses (1977–84)
- The Highest Official Committee of the Church of Greece (1977–85)
- The Committee of the Ecclesiastical Education of the Ministry of National Education and Religions (1977–82)
- The Commission for the Protection of the Cultural Legacy of Cyprus (1985–91)
- The Scholarships Commission of the Foundation Alexander Onassis (1978–94)
- The Foundation Alexander Onassis (1994–2005).
- The Philekpaideutike Society (1994 ff.).

=== International inter-ecclesiastical activity ===
- General Secretary of the «Executive Committee for the External Mission» (1958–61), and vice-president of the International Organization of Orthodox Youth «Syndesmos» (1964–1977).
- Member of the «International Commission for Missionary Studies» of the WCC (1963–1969).
- Secretary for «Missionary Research and the Relations with the Orthodox Churches», in the General Secretariat of the WCC (1969–71).

He was a member of many international scientific committees, such as:

- The «Deutsche Gesellschaft für Missionswissenschaft»
- The «International Society of Missionary Research»
- The Commission of the WCC for the Dialogue with Other Churches and Ideologies (1975–83)
- The Mixed Commission of the «Conference of European Churches» and the «Conference of Roman Catholic Bishops», «Islam in Europe» (1989–91)
- The «International Council» of the World Conference on Religion and Peace (1985–94).

From 1959 onwards he participated in a number of international, inter-Orthodox, inter-Christian and inter-religious conferences, and World Assemblies (several times as main speaker) representing the Church, or the university in international organizations. He has offered lectures to several University centers concerning Christian witness, the inter-religious dialogue, and worldwide solidarity and peace.

- Honorary member of the Curatorium of the Roman Catholic Institution «Pro Oriente», Vienna (1989 ff.).
- President-Moderator of the Commission on World Mission and Evangelism of the WCC (1984–1991).
- Member of the Central Committee of the WCC (1998–2006).
- Fellow of the Orthodox Academy of Crete (2001).
- Corresponding Member of the Academy of Athens (1993–2005).
- Member of the European Council of Religious Leaders/Religions for Peace (2001 ff.).
- Vice-president of the Conference of European Churches (2003–2009).
- President of the World Council of Churches (2006–) (one of the eight presidents).
- Honorary President of the World Conference of Religions for Peace (2006–).

== Illness and death ==
Anastasios tested positive for COVID-19 in November 2020 and was transported on a Greek military flight to Athens, where he was hospitalised for 12 days. He had regularly received medical treatment in Athens during his later years.

Anastasios was admitted to a Tirana hospital on 30 December 2024 due to a "seasonal virus"; he was airlifted by the Hellenic Air Force to Athens four days later and admitted to Evangelismos Hospital, where he underwent emergency laparoscopic surgery to treat gastrointestinal bleeding. He died from multiple organ failure on 25 January 2025, at the age of 95.

In his will, which was opened on 1 March during a memorial service in the Resurrection Cathedral of Tirana, Anastasios bequeathed half his savings to the completion of the Resurrection Cathedral and the other half to fund youth programmes and priest support services of the Church of Albania, his books to the Durrës Theological Academy and to other libraries, and his personal belongings to his close associates.

== Honours ==
- The Holy Cross of the Apostle and Evangelist Mark, First Class, of the Greek Orthodox Patriarchate of Alexandria (1985)
- The Holy Cross of Saint Catherine of the Mount Sinai (1985)
- The Holy Cross of Sts. Cyrill and Methodios of the Orthodox Church of Czeschoslovakia (1986)
- The Silver Medal of the Academy of Athens «as the promoter and pioneer of missionary theology and action» (1987)
- The Golden Medal with Laurel of the Greek Red Cross (1994)
- The Grand Cross of the Order of Honor of the Hellenic Republic (1997)
- The Medal of the Great Prince Vladimir (first class) of the Russian Church (1998)
- The Medal of Apostle Andreas of the Ecumenical Patriarchate (1999)
- The Grand Cross of the Order of the Orthodox Crusaders of the Holy Sepulchre (2000)
- The Athenagoras Human Rights Award 2001 (New York); the «Pro Humanitate», of the European Cultural Institution Pro Europe (Freiburg) (2001)
- The Grand Cross of the Order of Apostle Paul of the Church of Greece (2001)
- The Polish humanitarian award «Ecce Homo» (2003)
- The Medal from the President of the Romanian Democracy (2003)
- The Prize «for outstanding activities in strengthening Unity of Orthodox Christian Nations» (Moscow 2006)
- Grand Golden Medal of Apostle Barnabas of the Church of Cyprus (2008)
- The Grand Cross of the Order of Apostle Marc of the Patriarchate of Alexandria and all Africa (2009)
- Medal of George Kastrioti Skanderbeg of the Republic of Albania (2010)
- Supreme Order of the Emperor Constantine the Great of the Church of Serbia (2013)
- Medal of Prince Yaroslav the Wise, 1st Class, of the Ukrainian Democracy (2013)
- Medal of St. John Vladimir of the Patriarchate of Serbia (2016)
- «Klaus Hemmerle» Award (2020)

== Publications ==
- The Spirits M'bandwa and the framework of their Cult (1970, in Greek)
- The Lord of Brightness». The God of the Tribes East of Kenya. A Research in the History of Religion (in Greek, 1971; 3rd edition 1983)
- Various Christian Approaches to the Other Religions (1971)
- Islam: A General Survey (in Greek, 1975; 15th edition 2006)
- Universality and Orthodoxy (in Greek, 2000; 6th edition 2006), translated into Serbian (2002), Romanian (2003), Albanian (2004), Bulgarian (2005); and English as Facing the World: Orthodox Christian Essays on Global Concerns (St. Vladimir's Seminary Press, and WCC 2003).
- Footprints of the Quest for the Transcendent (in Greek, 2004; 3rd ed. 2006)
- Mission in Christ's Way (2007, in Greek).
- To the End of the Earth (2009, in Greek).
- In Africa (2010, in Greek).
- Three Catechetical Manuals (1960–1982; in seven reprints 1978–1982)

He also wrote more than 240 essays and articles, including:

- "Monks and Mission in the Eastern Church during the Fourth Century" (1966).
- "Les Missions des Eglises d'Orient" (1972).
- "Relations between Man and Nature in the World Religions" (1983)
- "Die Mystik in Byzanz" (1983).
- "Der Dialog mit dem Islam aus orthodoxen Sicht" (1986).
- "Orthodoxe Mission. Vergangenheit, Gegenwart, Zukunft" (1999).
- "Orthodoxy Faces the Third Millennium" (2000).
- "The Church of Albania. History and Spiritual Tradition" (2000).
- "Responsabilité apostolique et dimension universelle de l'Eglise" (2001).
- "Problems and Prospects of Inter-religious Dialogue" (2002).
- "God, in your grace transform the world" (2006).
- "Christen in einem multi-religiösen geeinten Europa" (2007).
- "La lumière du Christ et l'Europe" (2008). "Η Ορθόδοξος Αυτοκέφαλος Εκκλησία της Αλβανίας σήμερα" (2009). "Appelés à une seule espérance en Christ" (2009).

Founder and editor of bilingual quarterly Porefthentes (Go-Ye) (1960–1970), of the quarterly review Panta ta Ethne (All Nations) (1981–92). Also in Albanian: the quarterly Kërkim (Search) and the monthly newspaper Ngjallja (Resurrection). From his essays and articles a number have also been published into German, French, Russian, Swedish, Finnish, Serbian, Romanian, Bulgarian, Italian and Spanish. Archbishop Anastasios is considered a pioneer in the rekindling of the missionary endeavour in the Orthodox Churches. Scholar in the field of History of Religions and inter-religious dialogue. Simultaneously, he has struggled as a peace-maker within the Balkans.

== See also ==
- Rrok Mirdita
