= Christianity in Albania =

Christianity in Europe by percentage of country population Christianity in Europe (2010) 95–100%: Malta; Moldova; Armenia; Romania; Vatican City; 90–95%: San Marino; Portugal; Liechtenstein; Ireland; Serbia; Croatia; Poland; Iceland; 80–90%: Finland; Austria; Hungary; Bulgaria; Italy; Denmark; Ukraine; Norway; Slovakia; Monaco; Greece; Georgia; Andorra; Lithuania; 70–80%: Luxembourg; Belarus; Switzerland; Cyprus; Russia; Montenegro; Slovenia; Spain; 60–70%: France; Belgium; United Kingdom; Sweden; Germany; 50–60%: Netherlands; Latvia; North Macedonia; 30–40%: Bosnia and Herzegovina; Estonia; 20–30%: Czech Republic; 10–20%: Albania; Kazakhstan; 5–10%: Kosovo; 2–4%: Azerbaijan; < 1%: Turkey

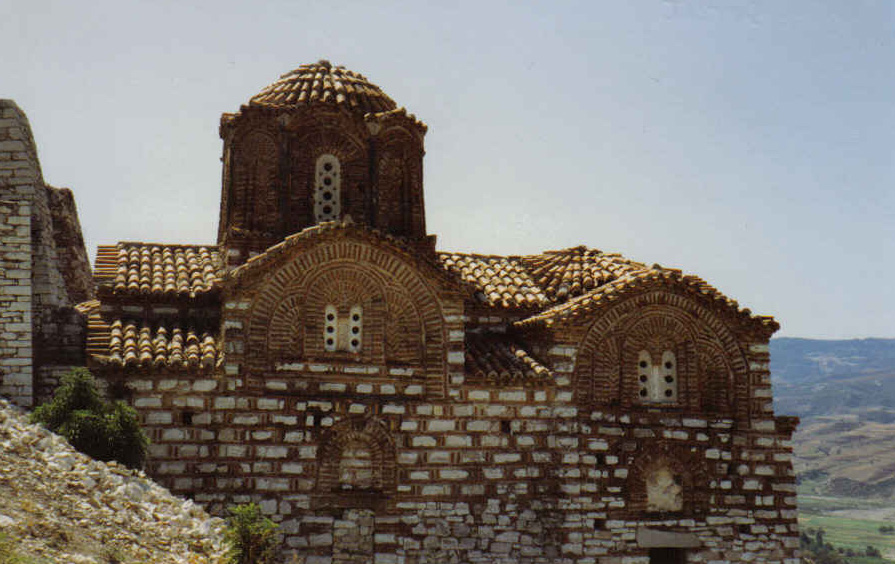
Byzantine Orthodox Church in Berat.

Christianity in Albania began when Christians arrived in Illyria soon after the time of Jesus, with a bishop being appointed in Dyrrhachium (Epidamnus) in 58 AD.

When the Roman Empire was divided in 395 AD, modern Albania became part of the Byzantine Empire, but was under the jurisdiction of the Pope until 732, when Emperor Leo III placed the church under the Patriarch of Constantinople. When the Christian church split in 1054, the north followed Rome while the south of the country stayed with Constantinople.

From 1100 AD, the Roman Empire carried out Church missions in the area. In relation to the increasing influence of Venice, the Franciscans started to settle down in the area in the 13th century. From the 15th century to the 19th century, under the rule of the Ottoman Empire, Christianity was replaced by Islam as the majority religion in Albania.

== Demographics ==
=== Census in 2011 ===
The 2011 population census, gives the percentages of religious affiliations with 58% Muslim, 10% Catholic, 7% Orthodox and 25% atheist, nonreligious or other since the fall of Communism in 1991. However the 2011 census is disputed due to poor counting of the population and the inability to reach most citizens. A 2015 study estimated some 13,000 conversions to Christianity from Muslim backgrounds.

=== Census in 2023 ===
According to the 2023 census, there were 1,101,718 (45.86%) Muslims, 201,530 (8.38%) Catholics, 173,645 (7.22%) Eastern Orthodox, 115,644 (4.81%) Bektashi Muslims, 9,658 (0.4%) Evangelicals, 3,670 (0.15%) of other religions, 332,155 (13.82%) believers without denomination, 85,311 (3.55%) Atheists and 378,782 (15.76%) did not provide an answer.

== Catholic Church ==
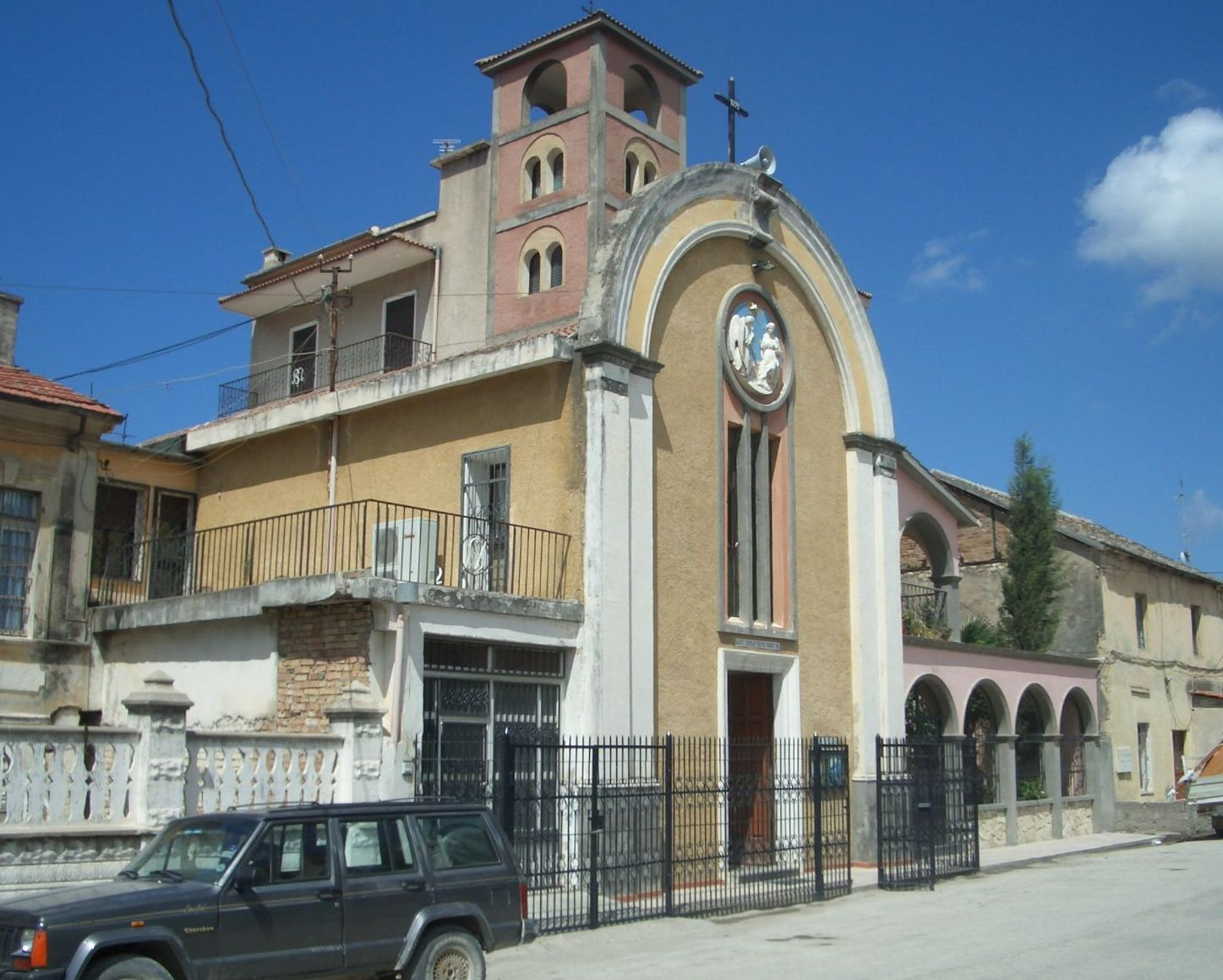
Catholic church in Vlorë.

The Catholic Church in Albania is part of the worldwide Catholic Church, under the spiritual leadership of the Pope in Rome. According to the numbers given by the government in 2011 it was stated that around 10.03% of the religious population is Catholic. The Albanian census in 2023 note that 8% of Albanians are Catholic.

There are five dioceses in the country, including two archdioceses plus an Apostolic Administration covering southern Albania.

Prior to the Ottoman invasion, Christianity was the religion of all Albanians. The northern Albanians adhered to Catholicism, whilst in the south they were followers of Eastern Orthodoxy.

== Eastern Orthodoxy ==
According to the numbers given by the government in 2010 it was stated that Eastern Orthodoxy was practiced by about 20% of Albanians within Albania. In the disputed 2011 census the percentage of Orthodox believers was listed as 6.75% of the population. Albania is historically linked with both the Catholic Church and Eastern Orthodoxy. Albanians were among the first peoples of the region to receive missionaries and convert to Christianity. With the split of the Church in 1054, Orthodoxy become the religion for the Albanians inhabiting the areas under the Byzantine rule.

The first Orthodox liturgy in the Albanian language was held not in Albania, but in Pennsylvania and Massachusetts. Subsequently, when the Orthodox Church was not allowed an official existence in communist Albania, Albanian Orthodoxy survived in exile in Philadelphia with the church in Philadelphia being founded in 1913 and in Boston in 1965.

== Protestantism ==
Figures in 2022 note that 0.45% of the population are Protestant. This is about 13,000 people. Many Protestant denominations come under the umbrella organisation, the Albanian Evangelical Alliance (VUSH).

== Freedom of religion ==
In 2022, Albania scored 4 out of 4 for religious freedom.

== See also ==
- Religion in Albania
- Eastern Orthodoxy in Albania
- Catholic Church in Albania
- Protestantism in Albania
- Christianization of Albania
