= Christopher of Albania =

Archbishop of Albania

His Beatitude Christopher
- Archbishop of Albania
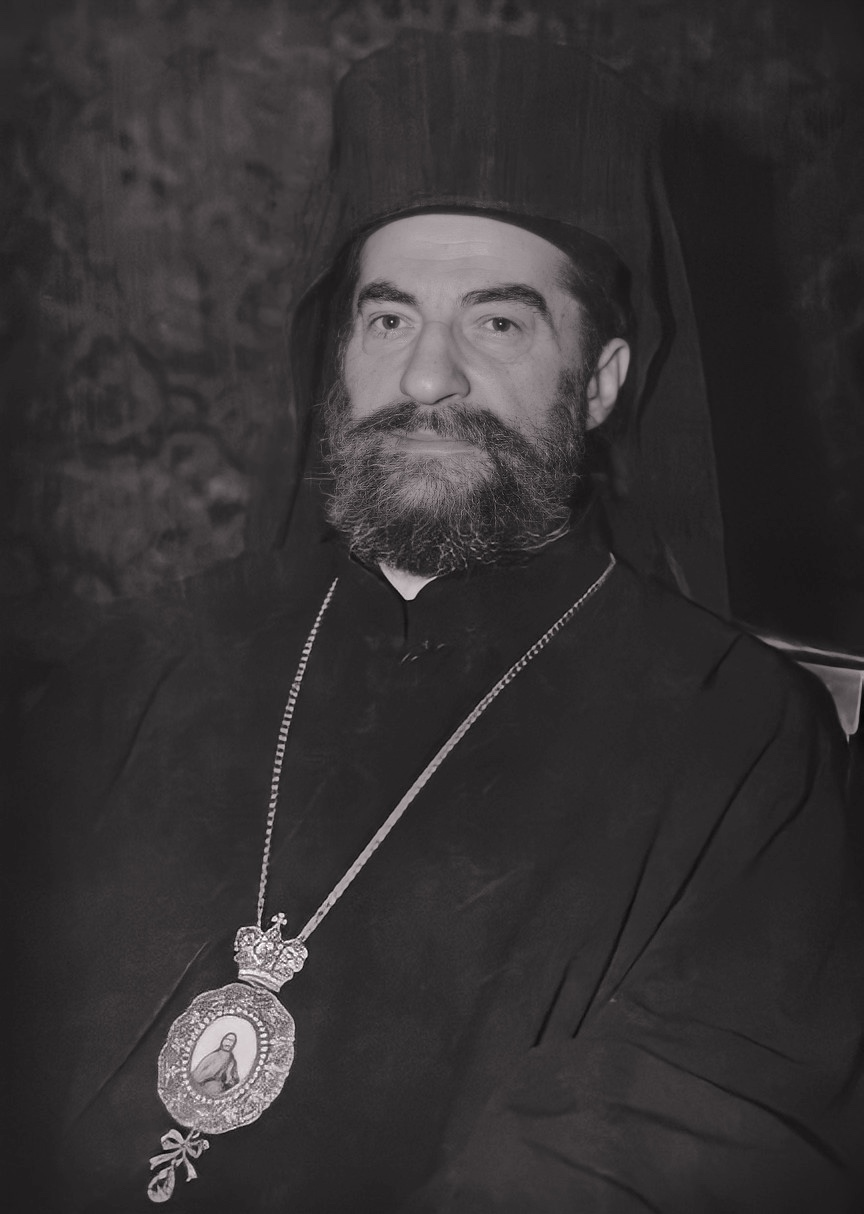
- Installed: 12 April 1937
- Term ended: 25 August 1949
- Predecessor: Vissarion
- Successor: Paisi
- Previous posts: Bishop of Berat, Vlorë, Kaninë and All Myzeqe (1923-1929) Bishop of Korçë (1934-1937)

Personal details
- Born: Sotir Kisi; 1881 Berat, Albania (then Ottoman Empire)
- Died: 17 June 1958 Tirana, Albania

Styles of The Archbishop of Tirana, Durrës and all Albania
- Reference style: His Beatitude
- Spoken style: Your Beatitude
- Religious style: Archbishop
- Posthumous style: N/A

Archbishop Christopher of Albania (Albanian: Kryepeshkopi Kristofori i Shqipërisë, secular name Sotir Kisi, 1881, Berat - 17 June 1958) was the primate of the Orthodox Autocephalous Church of Albania from 1937 to 1949. In 1959 he was found dead by poison.

== Biography ==
Sotir Kisi, who adopted the religious name Kristofor, was born in the Kala neighborhood of Berat, then part of the Ottoman Empire (now Albania), in 1881.

In 1937, Kristofor Kisi became the primate of the Orthodox Autocephalous Church of Albania (OACA). This appointment followed the official recognition of the OACA's autocephaly by the Ecumenical Patriarchate of Constantinople on April 12, 1937. This recognition was formalized through the issuance of a Patriarchal Tomos (decree), which was handed to Metropolitan Kristofor Kisi. Upon receiving the Tomos, Kisi was elevated to Archbishop and became Primate; on the same day, the Patriarchate also recognized the Holy Synod of the Church of Albania. As primate, Archbishop Kristofor Kisi succeeded Visarion Xhuvani. Xhuvani, whose removal was a condition for the autocephaly's recognition, had led the church during its period of unrecognized autocephaly and retired after reportedly receiving the Patriarch's forgiveness on April 16, 1937.

During World War II, under the Fascist Italian occupation, Archbishop Kisi faced pressure regarding an initiative by Italy and the Vatican to unite the Orthodox Autocephalous Church of Albania with the Roman Catholic Church, a move intended to transform it into an Eastern Catholic Church. Specifically, in 1942, the Italian Viceroy Francesco Jacomoni pressured Kisi to appoint Uniate bishops from Calabria to vacant episcopal seats. However, Archbishop Kisi resisted this pressure, employing delaying tactics and ordaining an Albanian theologian, Ilia Banushi (as Bishop Irine of Apollonia), to fill a vacant see, thereby preventing the imposition of these foreign bishops and this step towards union. This effort by the occupiers ultimately failed, due in significant part to Archbishop Kisi's resistance and compounded by Italy's defeat in 1943.

Archbishop Kisi and the OACA Holy Synod were supportive of the anti-Communist resistance movement that became prominent following World War II. This stance was reportedly in contrast to the position of some other Orthodox clergy and laity. Prior to this, during the German occupation of Albania in World War II, Kisi and the church leadership had welcomed the decision from German authorities to extend the jurisdiction of the Albanian Orthodox Church. This expansion included the Diocese of Prizren and the newly created bishoprics of Peshkopia and Struga.

The Communist regime forcibly removed Archbishop Kisi from his position as primate, compelling his resignation on August 25, 1948. Despite this, many continued to regard him as the legitimate head of the church. Archbishop Kristofor Kisi was found unconscious in the St. Procopius church in Tirana and died on June 17, 1958. Accounts suggest he was taken to a hospital but was denied adequate medical aid and effectively left to die, with poisoning widely cited as the cause of death under suspicious circumstances attributed to the regime.

Some accounts also state he died in custody or prison following his deposition.

Following Archbishop Kisi's forced removal (finalized around 1948-1949), his position as primate was filled by Pais Vodica (Pashko Vodica), a figure known for his loyalty to, and support from, the Communist regime. Vodica had been involved with the Communist-led National Liberation Front during the war and was considered a faithful supporter of the new government.
