= Legal name =

Name that identifies a person for legal, administrative and other official purposes

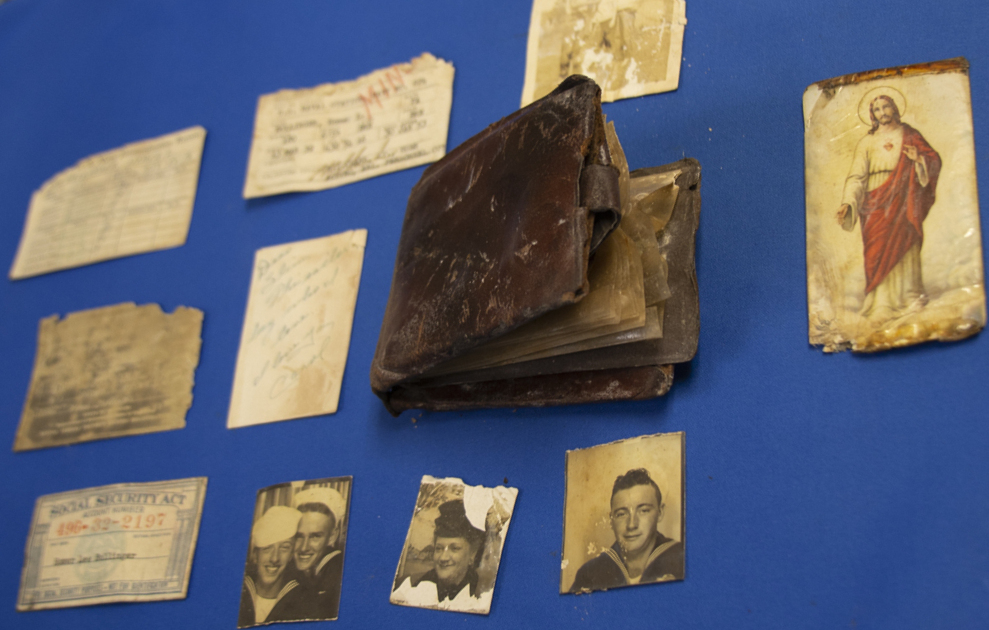
Identification cards found in a wallet

A legal name (variously called a government name or wallet name ) is the name that identifies a person for legal, administrative and other official purposes. A person's legal birth name generally is the name of the person that was given for the purpose of registration of the birth and which then appears on a birth certificate (see birth name), but may change subsequently. Most jurisdictions require the use of a legal name for all legal and administrative purposes, and some jurisdictions permit or require a name change to be recorded at marriage. The legal name may need to be used on various government issued documents (e.g., a court order). The term is also used when an individual changes their name, typically after reaching a certain legal age (usually eighteen or over, though it can be as low as fourteen in several European nations). A person's legal name typically is the same as their personal name, comprising a given name and a surname. The order varies according to culture and country. There are also country-by-country differences on changes of legal names by marriage. (See married name.) Most countries require by law the registration of a name for newborn children, and some can refuse registration of "undesirable" names.

== Name change ==
Some people legally change their name to be different from their birth name. Reasons for doing so include:

- Marriage, which usually involves adopting their spouse's surname. Some couples choose to blend their names together or choose a new surname entirely.
- Adoption, where the child's surname is changed to match that of their adoptive family.
- Transgender people adopting a name that aligns with their gender identity. The usage of their previous name is called deadnaming.
- Dislike of birth name.
- To remove associations with a slave name imposed on their ancestors.
- To reclaim a traditional name.
- To signify a religious conversion or entrance in some clerical or religious orders.
- A new identity resulting from witness protection.

== Jurisdiction by country ==
=== Canada ===
==== Quebec ====
The Civil Code of Quebec states that "Every person exercises his civil rights under the name assigned to him and stated in his act of birth," and spouses retain their legal names upon marriage. However, a woman married prior to April 2, 1981 is entitled to use her spouse's name in the exercise of her civil rights, provided that they were doing so at that date. A person's legal name can be changed, upon registration, only under prescribed conditions, and only where the person has been domiciled in Quebec for at least one year.

=== Germany ===
In Germany, names are regulated to a large extent. Apart from possibly adopting the partner's name upon marriage, German citizens may only change their name for a recognised important reason. Among other reasons, a change of names is permitted when the name can give rise to confusion, ridicule, unusual orthographic difficulties, or stigmatization. In certain situations, children's last names may also be changed to their natural, foster or adoptive parent's last name. Transgender people may change their first names. Foreign names in writing systems that are not based on Latin are transliterated according to rules which may conflict with the system of transcribing or transliterating names that is used in the country of origin. Former titles of nobility became integrated into the last names in 1919 but continue to be adapted according to gender and other circumstances.

=== United Kingdom ===
In the UK, businesses that trade under names other than those of the owner or a corporate entity must display the name of owner and an address at which documents may be served, or the name and registered number of the corporate body and its registered address. The requirements apply to sole traders and partnerships, but there are special provisions for large partnerships where listing all partners would be onerous.

The information must be shown on any trading premises where the public have access to trade and in documents such as order forms, receipts and, as of January 2007, corporate websites (to be extended later in 2007 to sole trader websites).

==== England and Wales ====
In strict English law, if there is such a thing as a "legal " surname, it is easily changed. In the words of A dictionary of American and English law, "Any one may take on himself whatever surname or as many surnames as he pleases, without statutory licence". This does not always seem to have applied to names given in baptism. As noted by Sir Edward Coke in Institutes of the Lawes of England, "a man may have divers names at divers times, but not divers Christian names." But in modern practice all names are freely changeable.

Changes of name are usually effected through deed poll, optionally enrolled either at the High Court of Justice or at the College of Arms, with a notice recorded in The London Gazette. Changes may also be made by means of a royal licence obtained through the College of Arms, with similar notice. These enrolment, licence and notice procedures are useful for having the new name appear in official documents; these procedures are therefore less likely to be useful for trans people or victims of abuse.

==== Scotland ====
Scots law allows anyone who wishes to do so to change their forename(s) or surname and such changes may be recorded in the official register held by the National Records of Scotland. Technically the Registrar General makes a correction to the entry. A correction can be recorded where a birth has been registered in Scotland, or where a person is the subject in Scotland of an entry in the Adopted Children Register, the Parental Order Register or the Gender Recognition Register. The above formalities are not necessary where a spouse/partner assumes the other spouse/partner's surname upon marriage or civil partnership, or reverts to their original name upon separation, divorce or dissolution of the civil partnership.

Only one change of name is allowed in the register where a person has not yet reached the age of 16, and afterwards only one change of forename and three changes of surname may be granted during a person's lifetime, provided that at least five years have passed between changes of surname. Name changes may also be recorded where:

- a decree or certificate has been granted by the Lord Lyon King of Arms,
- a certified copy of a will, settlement or deed of trust is produced, containing a condition that the person concerned takes a name different from his or her registered name, or
- an alternative forename or surname is used where the registered name is not in an English-language form.

==== Northern Ireland ====
Anyone born or adopted in Northern Ireland is able to change their name with the General Register Office of Northern Ireland in the following circumstances:

- a child's birth registration can be re-registered where its parents have subsequently married, or where a father that had not previously been identified is subsequently entered (whether by declaration, agreement or court order);
- a child's name can be changed once, before the age of 18, upon application by the parents (or adoptive parents, or guardian where the parents are deceased, as the case may be);
- a person aged 18 or over may apply to register one change of forename and three changes of surname during that person's lifetime, provided that at least five years have passed between changes of surname.

A deed poll can also be used in Northern Ireland for this purpose.

=== United States ===
Most states in the United States follow the common law which permits name changing for non-fraudulent purposes. This is actually the most common method, since most women who marry do not petition a court under the statutorily prescribed method, but simply use a new name (typically the husband's, a custom which started under the theory of coverture where a woman lost her identity and most rights when she married).

Most state courts have held that a legally assumed name (i.e., for a non-fraudulent purpose) is a legal name and usable as their true name, though assumed names are often not considered the person's technically true name.
