= List of cathedrals in Albania =

This is a list of cathedrals in Albania, sorted by Christian denomination.

== Eastern Orthodox ==
Cathedrals of the Albanian Orthodox Church include:

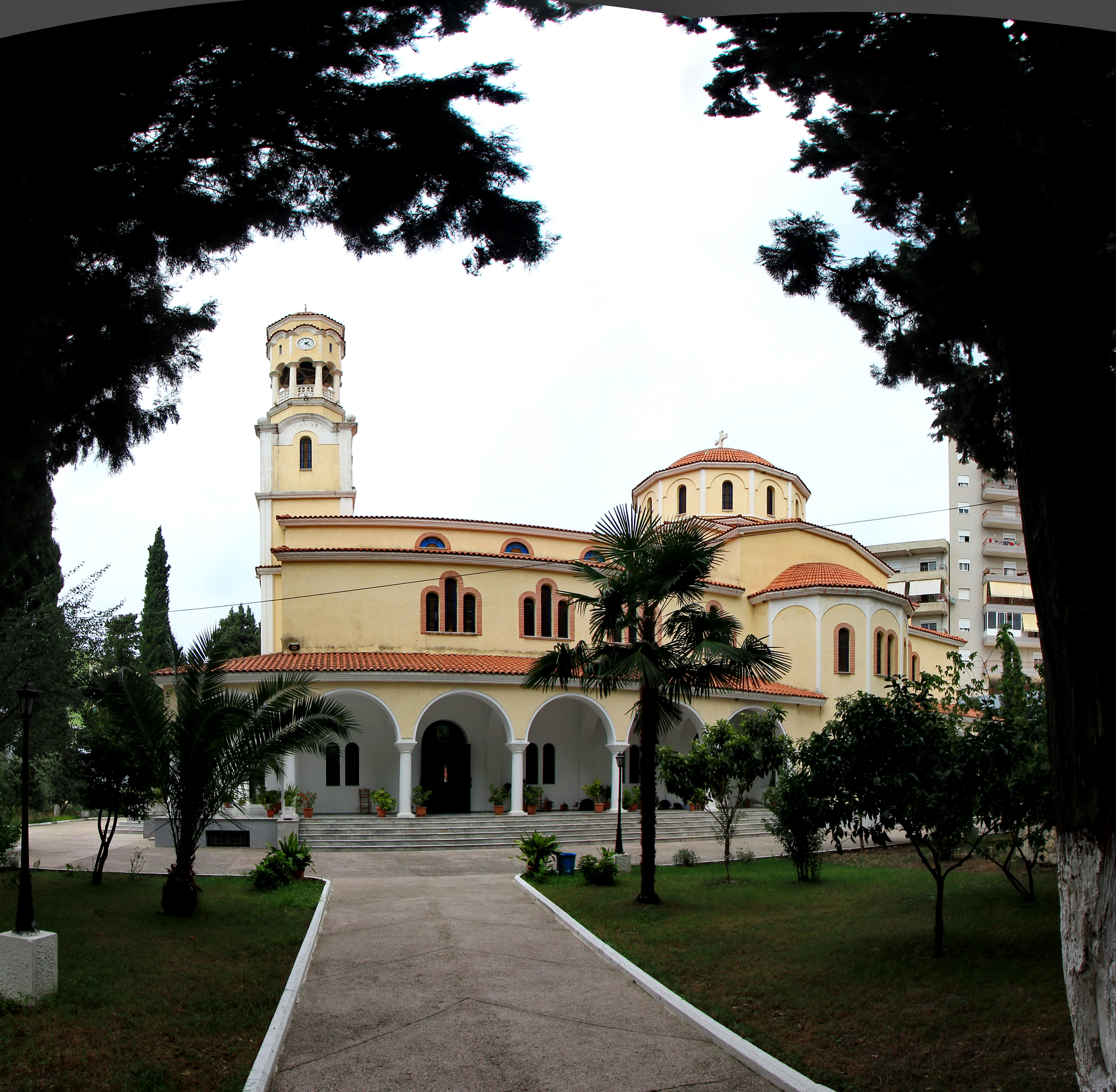
Cathedral of St George, Fier

Name	Municipality	Notes
Cathedral of Resurrection	Pogradec	
Cathedral of St. Demetrius build On 28 March 1979-in November 1990	Berat	
Cathedral of St. George	Fier	
Cathedral of St. Paul and St. Asteios	Durrës	
Cathedral of the Nativity of Christ	Shkodra	
Resurrection Cathedral	Tirana	
Resurrection Cathedral	Korçë	

== Catholic ==
Cathedrals of the Albanian Catholic Church include:

Name	Municipality	Notes
Cathedral of Jesus Saviour of the World	Rrëshen	
Cathedral of St. Nicholas	Lezhë	
Cathedral of St. Paul	Tirana	
Cathedral of St. Stephen Promomartyr	Shkoder	
Cathedral of Mother Teresa	Vau i Dejës	

== See also ==
- List of churches in Albania
- Christianity in Albania
- Lists of cathedrals by country
- List of Roman Catholic dioceses in Albania
