= Albanian Orthodox Church =

Eastern Orthodox jurisdiction in Albania

Orthodox Church of Albania
- Autocephalous Orthodox Church of Albania; Kisha Ortodokse Autoqefale e Shqipërisë
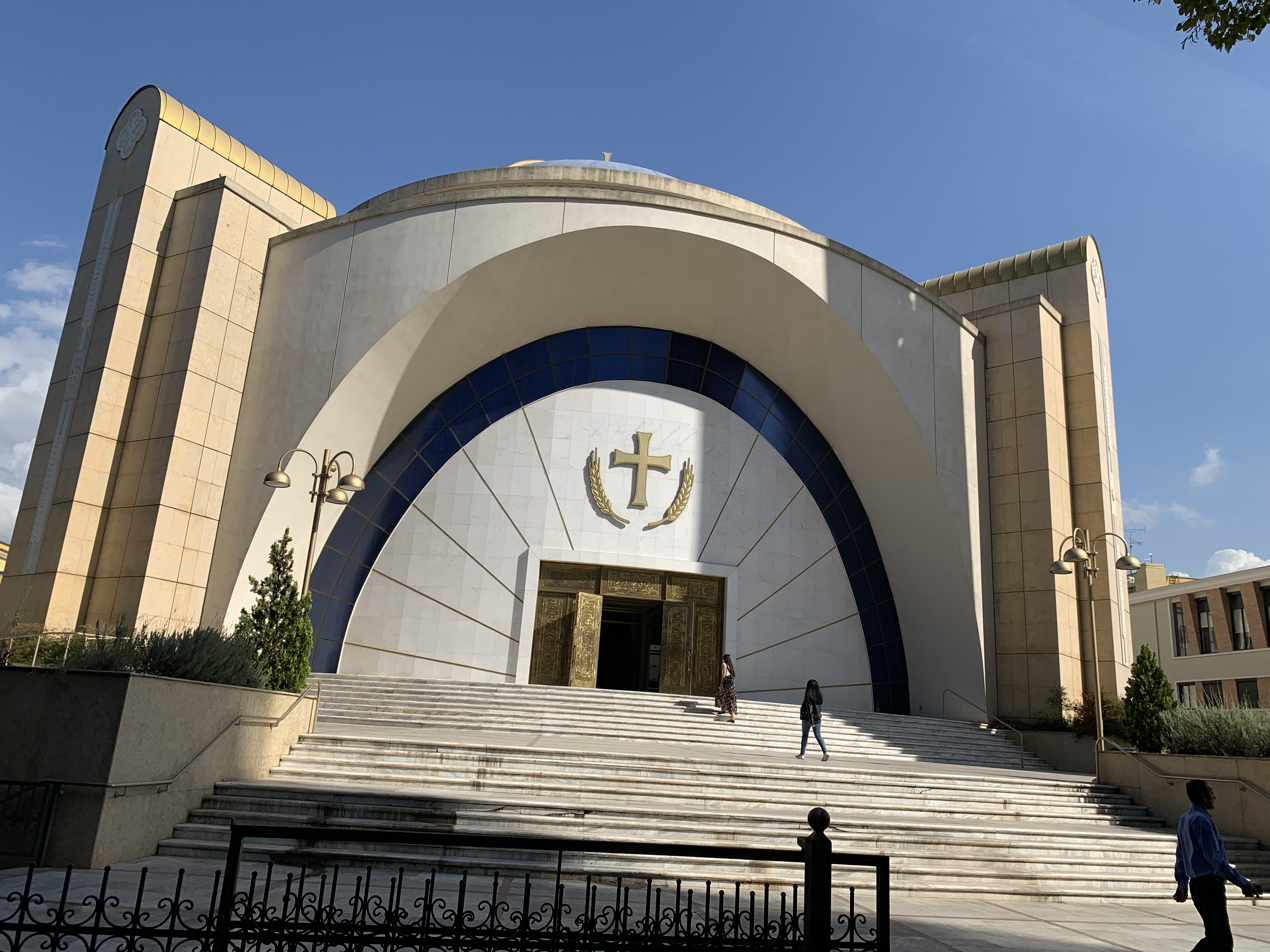
- Resurrection of Christ Cathedral in Tirana, Albania
- Type: Autocephaly
- Classification: Christian
- Orientation: Eastern Orthodox
- Scripture: Septuagint; New Testament
- Theology: Eastern Orthodox theology
- Polity: Episcopal
- Governance: Holy Synod
- Primate: John of Tirana-Durrës and All Albania
- Bishops: 7
- Priests: 135
- Parishes: 911
- Monasteries: 150
- Language: Albanian
- Liturgy: Byzantine Rite
- Headquarters: Resurrection Cathedral, Tirana, Albania
- Territory: Albania and Albanian diaspora
- Founder: Bishop Theofan S. Noli
- Independence: 1922
- Recognition: Autocephaly recognised in 1937 by the Ecumenical Patriarchate of Constantinople.
- Separated from: Ecumenical Patriarchate of Constantinople
- Members: 500,000–700,000
- Official website: orthodoxalbania.org

The Autocephalous Orthodox Church of Albania (Albanian: Kisha Ortodokse Autoqefale e Shqipërisë), commonly known as the Albanian Orthodox Church or the Orthodox Church of Albania, is an autocephalous Eastern Orthodox church in full communion with the other Eastern Orthodox churches. It declared its autocephaly in 1922 through its Congress of 1922, and gained recognition from the Patriarch of Constantinople in 1937.

The church suffered during the Second World War, and in the communist period that followed, especially after 1967 when Albania was declared an atheist state, and no public or private expression of religion was allowed.

The church has, however, seen a revival since religious freedom was restored in 1991, with more than 250 churches restored or rebuilt, and more than 100 clergy being ordained. It has 909 parishes spread all around Albania, and around 500,000 to 550,000 faithful. The number is claimed to be as high as 700,000 by some Eastern Orthodox sources, and higher when considering the Albanian diaspora.

== History ==
The Christian religious vocabulary of Albanian is mostly Latin, including terms such "to bless", "altar," and "to receive communion". It indicates that Albanians were Christianized under the Latin-based liturgy and ecclesiastical order which became known as "Roman Catholic" in later centuries. Ecclesiastically, Christians in Albania, as part of the province of Illyricum, were under the jurisdiction of the Bishop of Rome (2nd-8th century). From 732 to 733 AD the ecclesiastical jurisdiction of Illyricum was transferred to the Ecumenical Patriarchate of Constantinople. The Great Schism of 1054 formalized the split of Christianity into two branches, Catholicism and Eastern Orthodoxy, which was reflected in Albania through the emergence of a Catholic north and Orthodox south.

=== Orthodox Church during the Ottoman Period ===
The official recognition of the Eastern Orthodox Church by the Porte resulted in the Eastern Orthodox population being tolerated until the late 18th century. The Eastern Orthodox population of Albania was integrated into the Patriarchate of Constantinople, with the population of central and south-eastern Albania being under the ecclesiastical jurisdiction of the Archbishopric of Ohrid, and the population of south-western Albania being under the ecclesiastical jurisdiction of the Metropolis of Ioannina.

During the late 18th century, the poverty of the Eastern Orthodox Church, the illiterate clergy, a lack of clergy in some areas, liturgy in a language other than Albanian and the reliance of the bishoprics of Durrës and southern Albania upon the declining Archbishopric of Ohrid, due in part to simony, weakened the faith among the church's adherents and reduced the ability for Eastern Orthodox Albanians to resist conversion to Islam.

=== Movement for establishing an autocephalous Albanian Orthodox Church ===
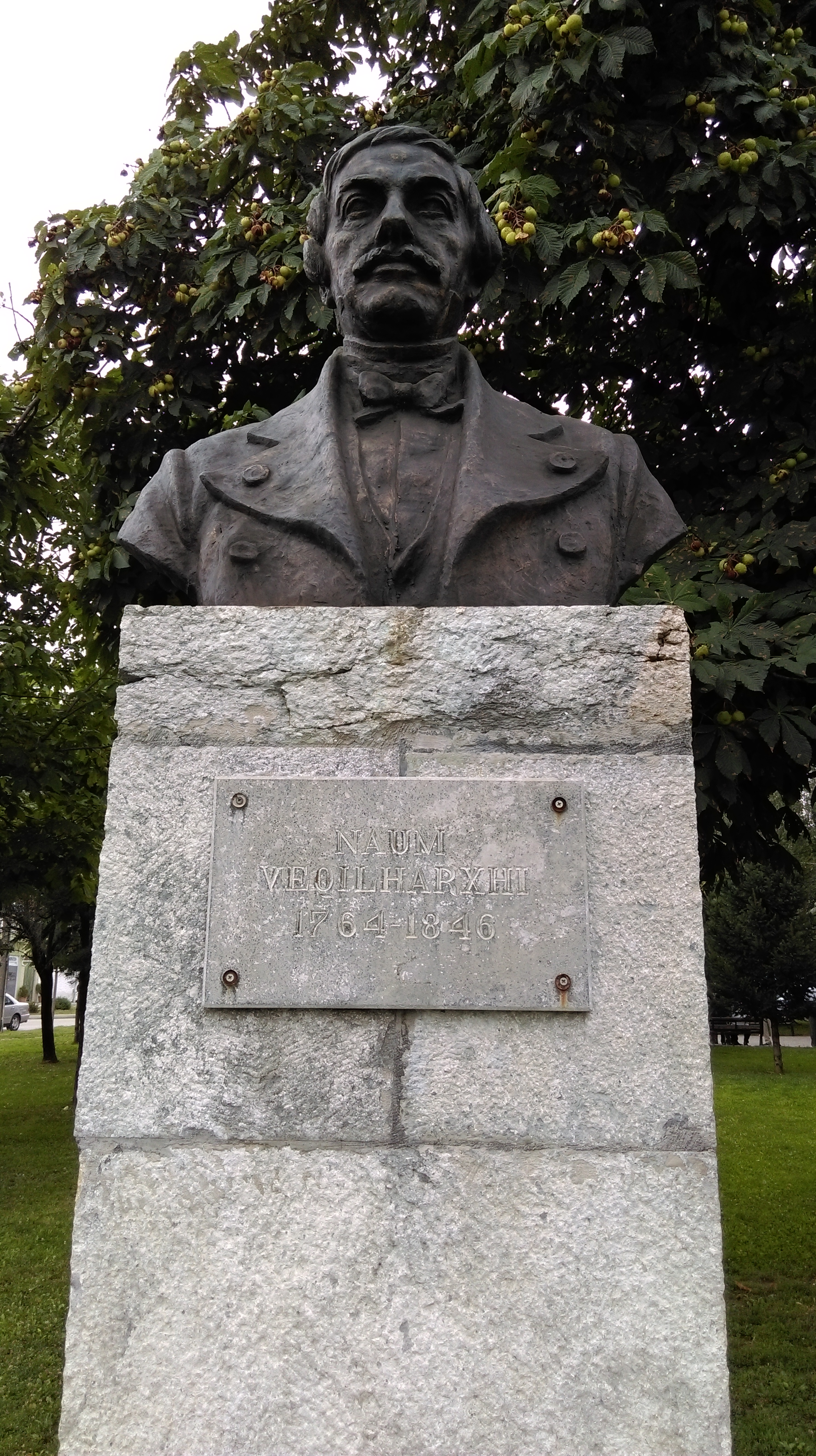
Bust of Naum Veqilharxhi, Korçë, the Eastern Orthodox "father of the Albanian alphabet" and a former participant in the Wallachian uprising of 1821 who went on to begin the Albanian Literary Renaissance.

In the 19th century, Eastern Orthodox Albanians under the Patriarchate of Constantinople had liturgy and schooling in Greek, which was also the lingua franca in the South, and in the late Ottoman period their political thinking was divided: although most Eastern Orthodox Christians wished for the end of Ottoman rule, some of them - especially the upper class - desired to be part of a Greek state, some sought Greek-Albanian cooperation and a Greek-Albanian federation state or dual monarchy, and some who sought Albanian statehood. For Eastern Orthodox Albanians, Albanianism was closely associated with Hellenism, linked through the faith of Eastern Orthodoxy. However, during the Eastern crisis this premise was rejected by some Albanian Eastern Orthodox Christians, because of the growing competition between the Albanian and Greek national movements over parts of Epirus. These issues also generated a reaction against Greek nationalists that drove the Albanian desire to stress a separate cultural identity.

The religious division among Albanians meant that Albanian nationalism could not be based on religion and instead Albanian nationalism as it developed tended to promote interreligious cooperation, from the point of its inception in the writings of Naum Veqilharxhi. Although the Eastern Orthodox were a minority among Albanians, the Albanian nationalist movement began among the Orthodox, and subsequently spread to other religious communities among Albanians. Eastern Orthodox Albanians especially in the diaspora and from Korçë and its nearby regions began to affiliate with the movement by working together with Muslim Albanians regarding shared socio-geopolitical Albanian interests and aims, causing concerns for Greece because it threatened the aspirations to incorporate Epirus into Greece, and because those Greeks who sought an Albanian-Greek confederation took a negative view of other foreign influences among Albanians. Although Greek schools were for a while the only way Eastern Orthodox children could become educated and at Greek schools children where they were exposed to Greek nationalism, Eastern Orthodox Albanians would instead come to play an active and often leading role in the Albanian national independence movement, often at great cost to themselves and their families.

Flag of the Albanian Orthodox Church

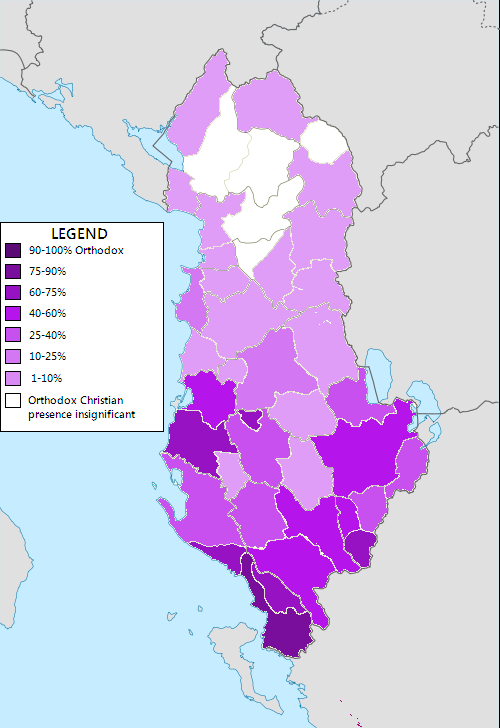
Distribution of Eastern Orthodox Christians in Albania, based on the 1877, 1908 and 1918 censuses.

At the onset of the twentieth century, the idea to create an Albanian Orthodoxy or an Albanian expression of Eastern Orthodoxy emerged in the diaspora at a time when the Eastern Orthodox were increasingly being assimilated by the Patriarchate and Greece through the sphere of politics. As Eastern Orthodoxy was associated with the Greek identity, the rise of the movement caused confusion for Eastern Orthodox Albanians as it interrupted the formation of a Greek national consciousness. The Eastern Orthodox Albanian community had individuals such as Jani Vreto, Spiro Dine and Fan Noli involved in the national movement, of which some advocated for an Albanian Orthodoxy in order to curtail the Hellenisation process occurring amongst Orthodox Albanians. In 1905, priest Kristo Negovani introduced Albanian liturgy for Orthodox worship in his native Negovan for the first time, for which he was murdered by Greek andartes on behalf from Bishop Karavangelis of Kastoria, leading to the retaliatory murder of the Metropolitan of Korçë, Photios, who opposed the Albanian national movement. In 1907, Eastern Orthodox Albanian immigrant Kristaq Dishnica was refused funeral services in the United States by a local Eastern Orthodox Greek priest for being an Albanian involved in nationalist activities. Known as the Hudson incident, it galvanised the emigre Eastern Orthodox Albanian community to form the Albanian Orthodox Church under Fan Noli who hoped to counter Greek irredentism.

On March 18, 1908, as a result of the Hudson incident, Fan Noli was ordained as a priest by Russian bishop Platon in the United States. Noli conducted the Eastern Orthodox liturgy (March 1908) for the first time among the Albanian-American community in Albanian. Noli also devoted his efforts toward translating the liturgy into Albanian and emerging as a leader of the Eastern Orthodox Albanian community in the US. In 1911 he visited the Eastern Orthodox Albanian diasporas in Romania, Ukraine and Bulgaria.

=== Autocephaly and statutes ===
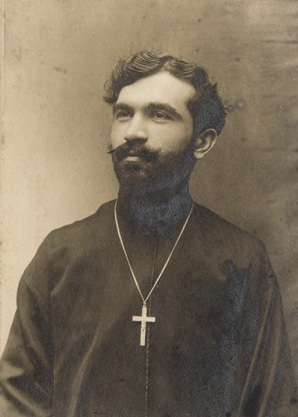
Bishop Fan Noli, founder of the Eastern Orthodox Autocephalous Church of Albania.

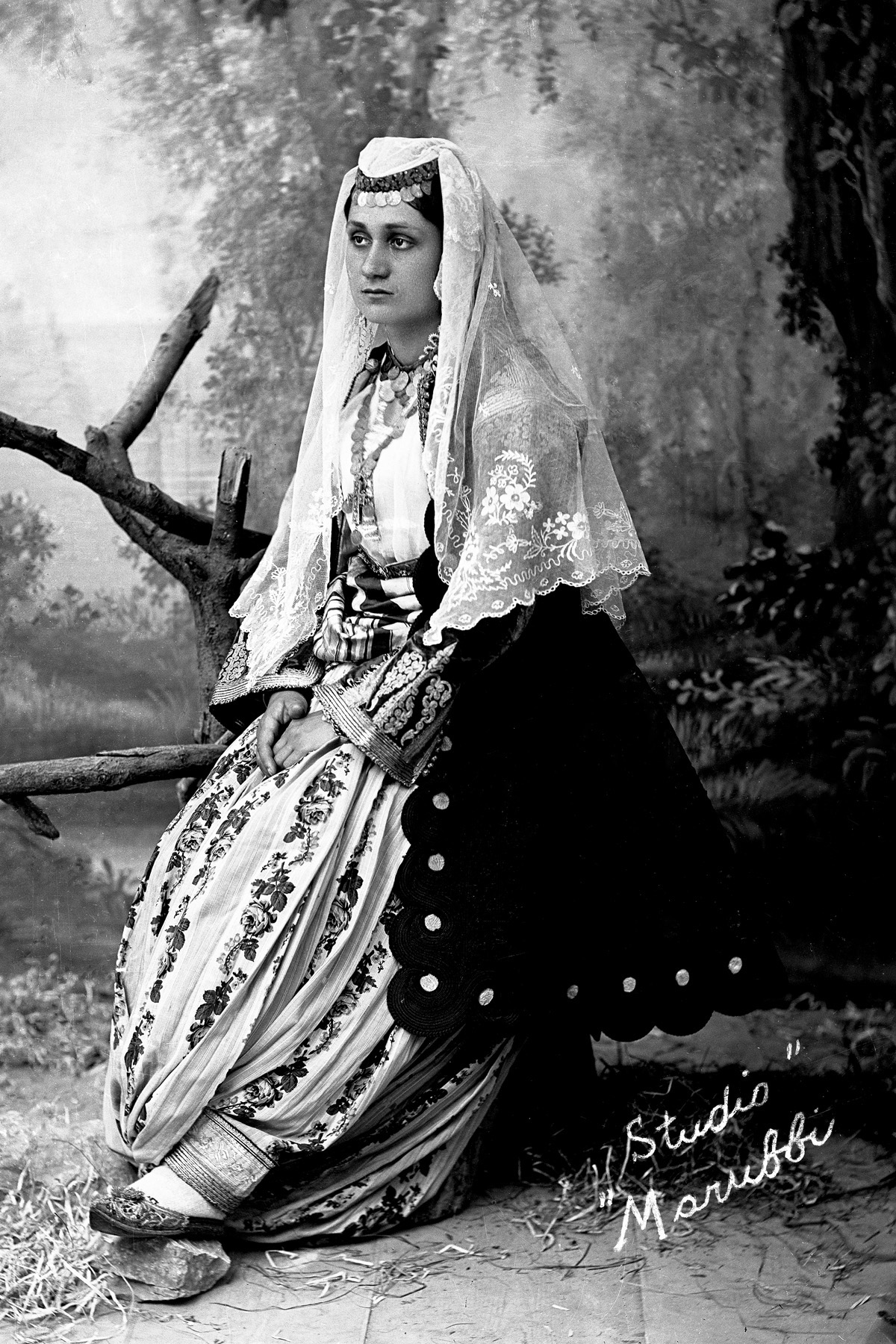
Albanian Eastern Orthodox woman in traditional clothes, 1922

After Albanian independence in 1912, Fan Noli, who would become an important political figure and prime minister of Albania in 1924, traveled to Albania, where he played an important role in establishing the Albanian Orthodox Church. From September 10 to 12, 1922, the first Orthodox Congress convened in Berat, formally laying the foundations for an Albanian Orthodox Church and declaring its autocephaly. The Congress established a provisional ecclesiastical council to administer the church. Fan Noli was subsequently consecrated as Bishop of Korçë and primate of Albania, while the establishment of an autocephalous Albanian Orthodox Church was seen as an important development in maintaining Albanian national unity. At the end of the Congress, the first statute of the church was approved.

In February 1929, the Holy Synod of the Albanian Orthodox Church was established, with Visarion Xhuvani as Archbishop of Albania and overseer of the Metropolis of Korçë, Agathangjel Çamçe as Metropolitan of Berat, Ambroz Ikonomi as Metropolitan of Gjirokastër, and Efthim Kosteva as assistant to the Archbishop. On June 29, 1929, the Second Clergy–Laity Congress was held in Korçë, where a second statute, entitled the "Statute of the Autocephalous Orthodox Church of Albania", was adopted, amending the statute approved at the Congress of Berat in 1922. On the same date, the Regulation of General Administration of the church was approved. The Ecumenical Patriarchate initially refused to recognize these acts, but subsequently entered into negotiations concerning the church's status. It recognized the autocephaly of the Orthodox Autocephalous Church of Albania in 1937.

On November 26, 1950, the Parliament of Albania approved the Third Statute, which abrogated the 1929 Statute. The new statute required Albanian citizenship for the primate of the church (Article 4). With the exception of amendments made in 1992, this statute remained in force for the church.

On July 11, 1992, the 1950 Statute was amended, and in 1996 the amendments were approved by the then-president, Sali Berisha. In particular, Article 4 of the 1950 Statute, which had required Albanian citizenship for the primate of the church, no longer contained this requirement. On November 3 and 4, 2006, at the new Monastery of St. Vlash in Durrës, a special Clergy–Laity Assembly of the Orthodox Autocephalous Church of Albania was held, attended by 257 representatives, including all clergy members. At the Assembly, the new Constitution (Statute) of the church was discussed and unanimously adopted. On November 6, 2006, the Holy Synod approved the Constitution (Statute). On November 24, 2008, the Orthodox Autocephalous Church of Albania and the Council of Ministers signed an agreement, pursuant to the 1998 Constitution of Albania, regulating their reciprocal relationship. The agreement was ratified by the Albanian Parliament and became law (No. 10057) on January 22, 2009.

=== Persecution ===
The church greatly suffered during the dictatorship of Enver Hoxha as all churches were placed under government control, and land originally held by religious institutions was taken by the state. Religion in schools was banned. Similarly, Hoxha propagated that Albania was threatened by religion in general, since it served as the supposed "Trojan Horse" of the interests of the country's traditional enemies; in particular Eastern Orthodoxy (those of Greece and Serbia).

In 1967 Hoxha closed down all religious buildings in the country, and declared Albania the world's first atheist country. All expression of religion, public or private, was outlawed. Hundreds of clergy were killed or imprisoned. As a result of this policy, a total of 600 Eastern Orthodox churches were demolished (1,600 present in 1944). Other buildings of the Eastern Orthodox community forcibly seized their religious function.

=== Revival of the church ===
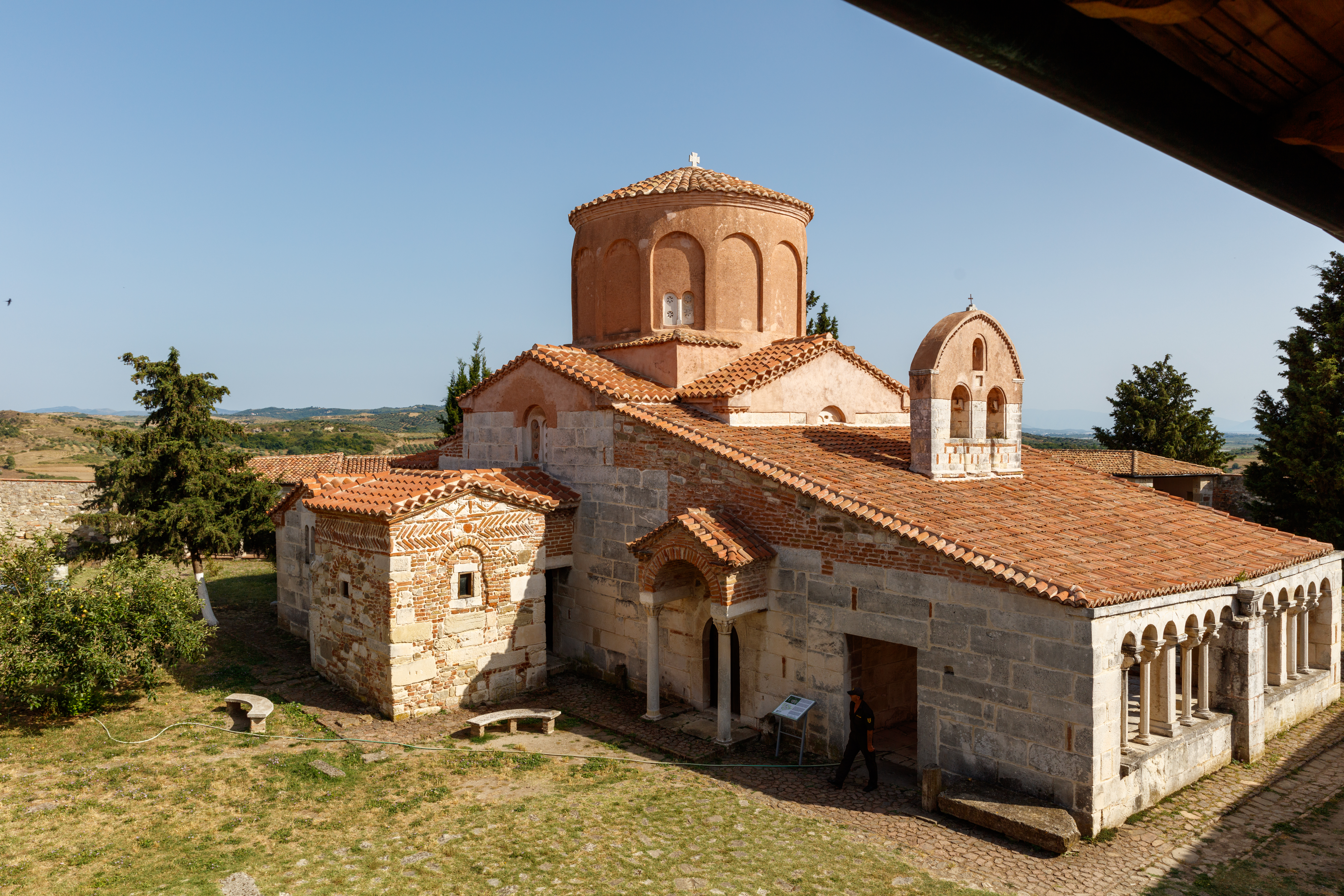
St. Mary's Church in Apollonia

At the end of the communist rule, when religious freedom was restored, only 22 Eastern Orthodox priests remained alive. To deal with this situation, the Ecumenical Patriarch appointed Anastasios to be the Patriarchal Exarch for the Albanian Church. As Bishop of Androusa, Anastasios was dividing his time between his teaching duties at the University of Athens and the Archbishopric of Irinoupolis in Kenya, which was then going through a difficult patch, before his appointment. He was elected on July 11, 1992, and enthroned on August 2, 1992.

Most parishes use the Albanian language in liturgy, while Greek is also partly used. In Greek minority areas the liturgy is accordingly celebrated in Greek.

Students are continuing their theological educations in theological universities abroad.

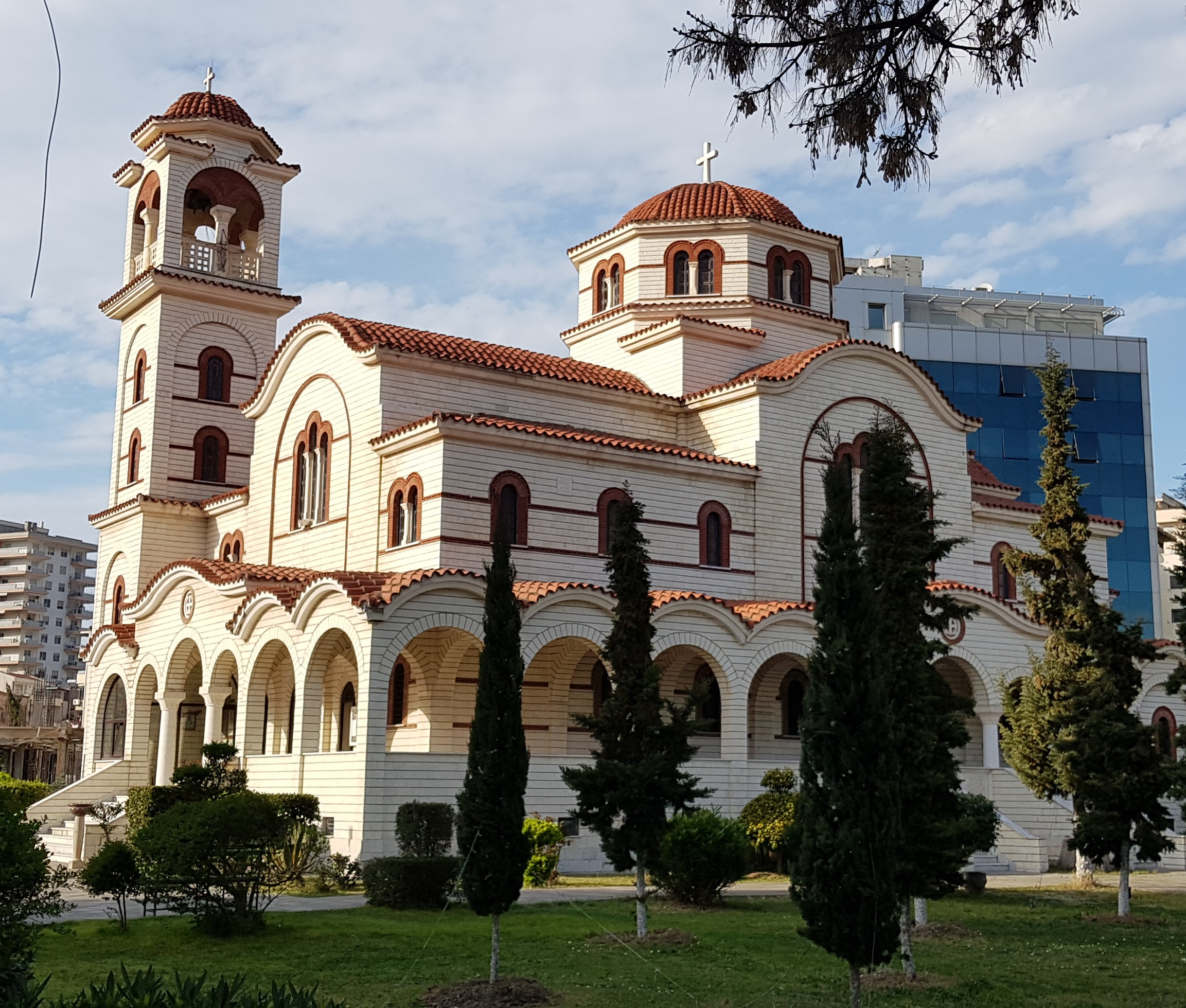
Church of Apostle Paul and Saint Asteios in Durrës, constructed between 1994 and 2002.

So far, 150 new churches have been built, 60 monasteries and more than 160 churches have been repaired.

== Media and publishing ==
The Orthodox Church of Albania has its own radio station, named "Ngjallja" (Resurrection) which 24 hours a day broadcasts spiritual, musical, informative and educational programmes and lectures, and has a special children's programme.

== Social activities ==
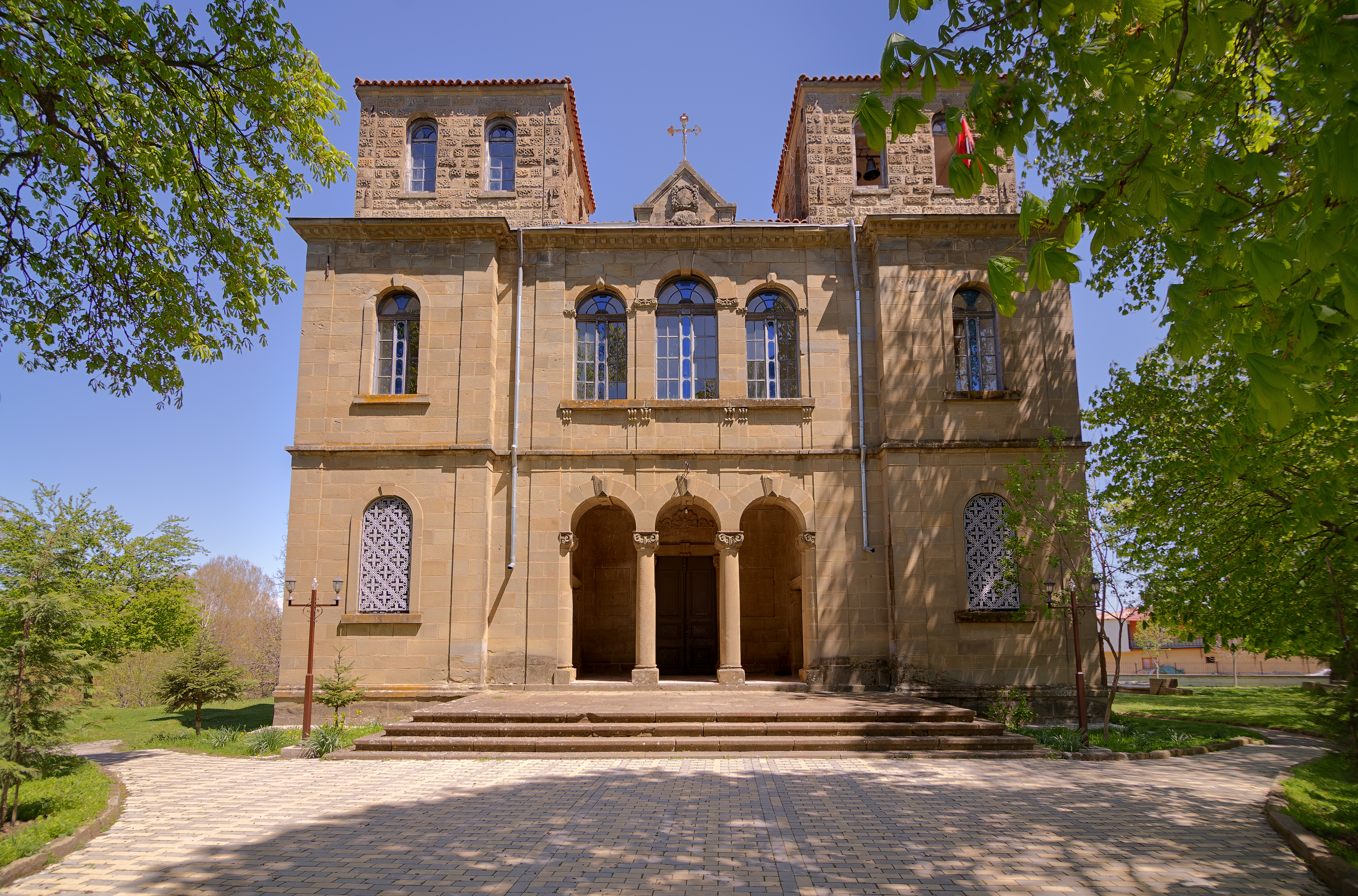
St. Nicholas Church in Hoçisht

The Orthodox Church in Albania has taken various social initiatives. It started with health care, organising "The Annunciation" Orthodox Diagnostic Center in Tirana in 1999, with some of Albania's most renowned doctors and administers health care and most contemporary health services in 23 different specialties; four medical clinics, and one mobile dental clinic. The office "Service of Love" (Diakonia Agapes) contributes to the increasing of midwives' and nurses' roles, offering training projects and assistance.

The Orthodox Autocephalous Church of Albania made extensive humanitarian contributions during the political and social crises (1992, 1994, 1997), collecting and distributing thousands of tons of food, clothing and medicine. In addition, it supported a wide range of social programs including: development projects in mountainous regions, especially in the areas of agriculture and farming; road construction; amelioration of water supplies; educational programs on health for children; construction of rural health centers and contributions for schools, orphanages, hospitals, institutes for the disabled, elderly homes, prisons (i.e. financed by the church, where would prisoners work and receive income accordingly), sports grounds, soup kitchens for the poor, and many more.

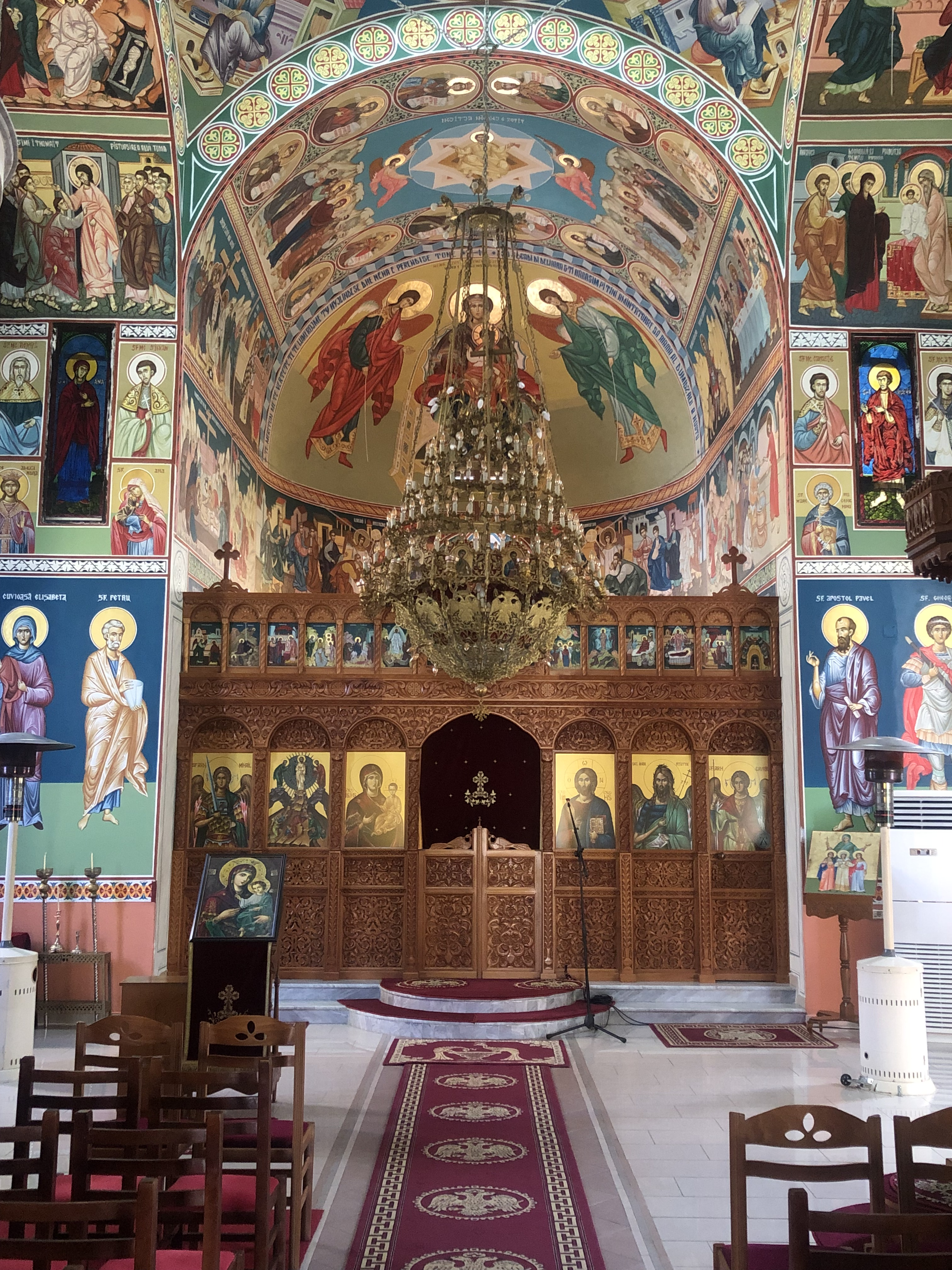
Interior of the St. Sotir Church in Korçë

Apart from the two ecclesiastical high schools, it has established three elementary schools (1st – 9th grade), 17 day-care centers and two institutes for professional training (named "Spirit of Love", established in Tirana in 2000) which are said to be the first of their kind in Albania and provide education in the fields of Team Management, IT Accounting, Computer Science, Medical Laboratory, Restoration and Conservation of Artwork and Byzantine Iconography.

An environmental programme was started in 2001.

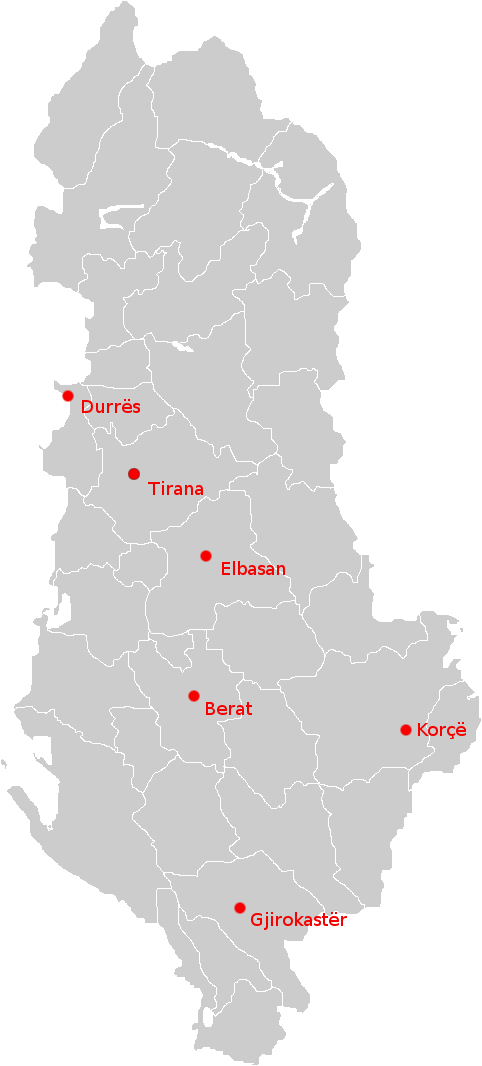
Seats of the Albanian Orthodox Bishops

== Primates ==
The Primate of the Orthodox Autocephalous Church of Albania is also the Archbishop of Tirana and Durrës. The current archbishop of Tirana is Archbishop Joani.

No.	Portrait	Name	Term in office	
1		Vissarion	20 February 1929	26 May 1937
1		Vissarion	8 years, 3 months and 6 days	
2		Kristofor	12 April 1937	25 August 1949
2		Kristofor	12 years, 4 months and 13 days	
3		Paisi	25 August 1949	4 March 1966
3		Paisi	16 years, 6 months and 7 days	
4		Damian	7 March 1966	8 October 1973
4		Damian	7 years, 7 months and 1 day	
Vacant during Communism (1973–1992)
5		Anastasios	11 July 1992	25 January 2025
5		Anastasios	32 years, 6 months and 14 days	
6		Joani	16 March 2025	Present
6		Joani	1 year, 6 months and 17 days	

== Administration and Holy Synod ==
The Holy Synod of Bishops was established in 1997, and is currently composed of:

- Archbishopric of Tirana-Durrës: Archbishop John (2025–), head of the Holy Synod, Exarch of Illyricum
- Metropolis of Korçë: Anastas (2025–)
- Metropolis of Berat, Vlorë and Kaninë: Asti (2024–)
- Metropolis of Gjirokastër: Nathanail (2025–)
- Metropolis of Elbasan, Shpat and Librazhd: Andon (2017–)
- Metropolits of Apollonia and Fier: Nikolla of Apollonia (2014–)
- Titular Bishop of Amantia: Ignat (2026–)

== See also ==
- Religion in Albania
- Albanian Byzantine Catholic Church
- Christianity in Albania
