= Resurrection Cathedral, Tirana =

Orthodox cathedral in Tirana, Albania

Resurrection of Christ Cathedral
- Katedralja Ngjallja e Krishtit
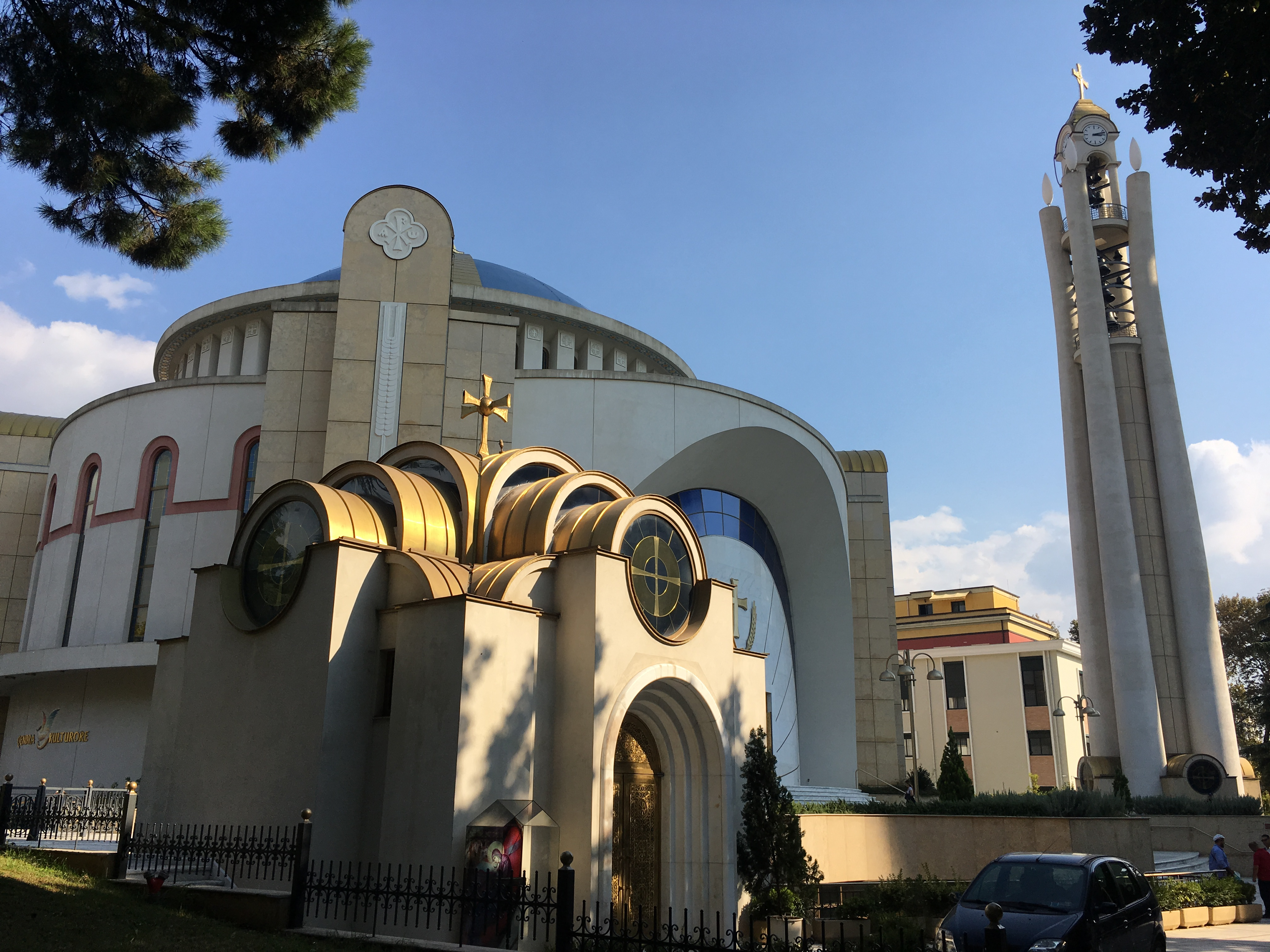
- The cathedral in 2016
- Resurrection of Christ Cathedral
- 41°19′35″N 19°49′03″E
- Address: Tirana
- Country: Albania
- Denomination: Eastern Orthodox
- Churchmanship: Albanian Orthodox Church
- Website: orthodoxalbania.org (in Albanian)

History
- Consecrated: 1 June 2014

Architecture
- Functional status: Active
- Architect: Steven P. Papadatos
- Architectural type: Church
- Completed: 24 June 2012; 14 years ago

Specifications
- Height: 46 m (151 ft)

Administration
- Archdiocese: Tirana, Durrës and All Albania

Clergy
- Archbishop: Joani of Albania

The Resurrection of Christ Cathedral (Katedralja Ngjallja e Krishtit) is an Albanian Orthodox church cathedral situated in the center of Tirana, Albania. It is considered among the largest Eastern Orthodox churches in the Balkans.

It was officially opened on 24 June 2012, to celebrate the 20th anniversary of the revival of the Albanian Orthodox Church and the election of Archbishop Anastasios of Albania.

== Architecture and engineering ==
Designed by the New York City-based Architect and Engineering team of Steven P. Papadatos and Lizardos Engineering Associates. The complex of the cathedral includes the following buildings: the cathedral, the chapel of the Nativity, the bell tower, the residence of the Holy Synod, the cultural center, a library, two other chapels and a small museum. The cathedral's dome is 32.2 metres (106 ft) high, with the bell tower reaching 46 metres (151 ft).

The bell tower, designed and sculpted by Archbishop Anastasios, is composed of four Paschal candles which symbolize the four Evangelists who proclaimed the Resurrection. These join around the central shaft of stairs. The winding staircase leads to two open floors with 16 bells. A four-sided clock sits above the bells. The two underground levels below the cathedral church were used to fulfill the church's need for a Cultural and Conference Center. The center has an amphitheatre with a capacity for 500-850 people which may be used to host lectures, shows, and concerts. The auxiliary wings and backstage allow this hall to be used as a theater also.

On the eastern side of the amphitheater is a small museum, a lecture hall, a surrounding for banquets and an area for exhibitions and children's activities.

To the right of the grand marble staircase which leads to the church cathedral there is ample space for a bookstore and a store with church items. Meanwhile, to the left of the stairs are two rooms where youth groups and faithful can gather after church services. To the north, in front of the Conference and Cultural Center there is a small outdoor amphitheater, for use during summer months.

== Opening ==
On 1 June 2014, in the presence of a multitude of worshippers, the rite of the Great Consecration and the Divine Liturgy were celebrated by Ecumenical Patriarch Bartholomew of Constantinople, Patriarch Daniel of Romania, Patriarch Theophilos of Jerusalem, Patriarch Irenaeus of Serbia, Archbishop Chrysostom of Cyprus, Archbishop Ieronymos of Athens, Archbishop Anastasios of Albania, Metropolitan Savva of Warsaw, as well as representatives of the Churches of Alexandria, Antioch, Russia, Georgia, Bulgaria, and the head of the Albanian archdiocese of the Orthodox Church in America.

== Gallery ==
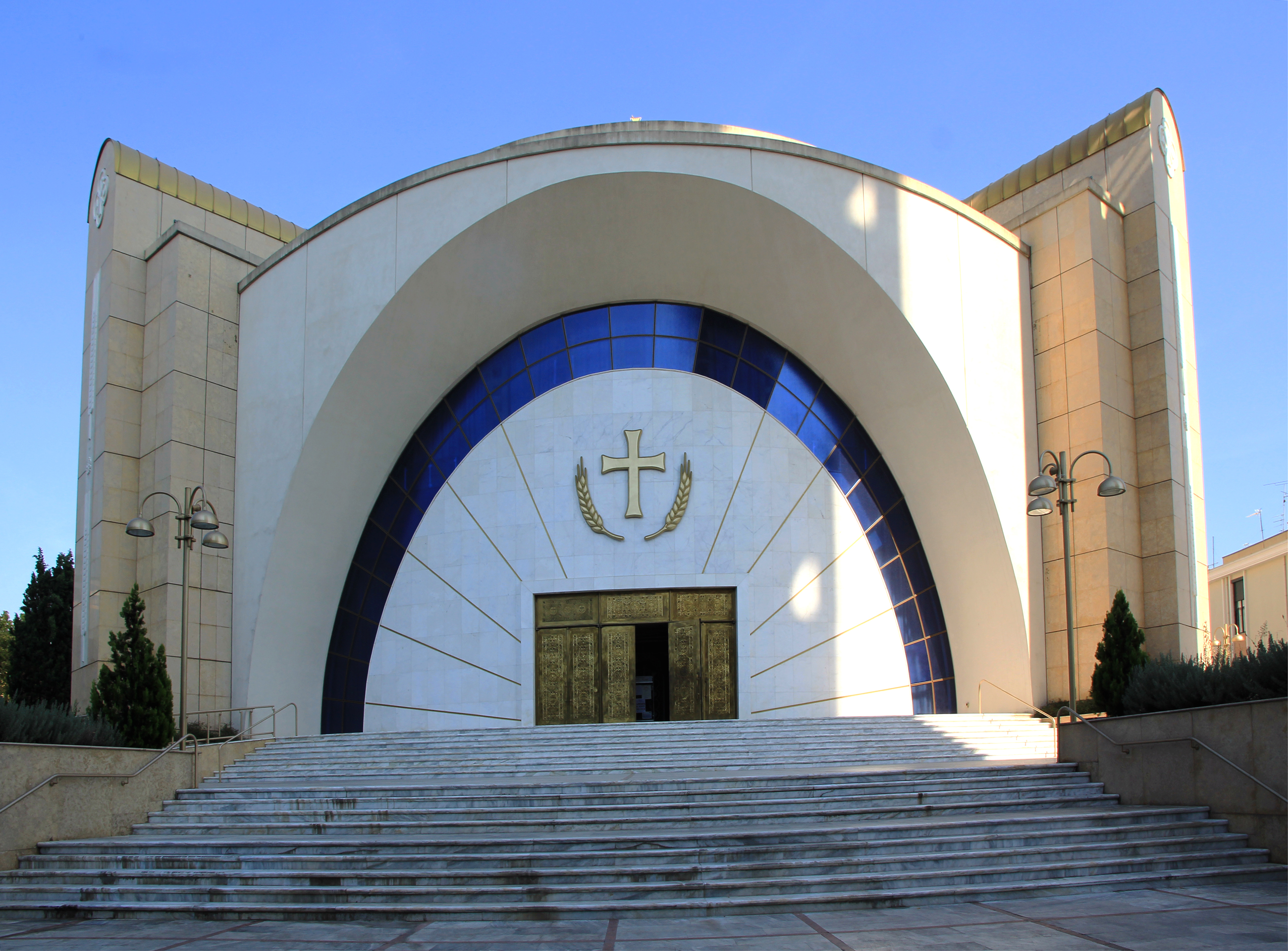

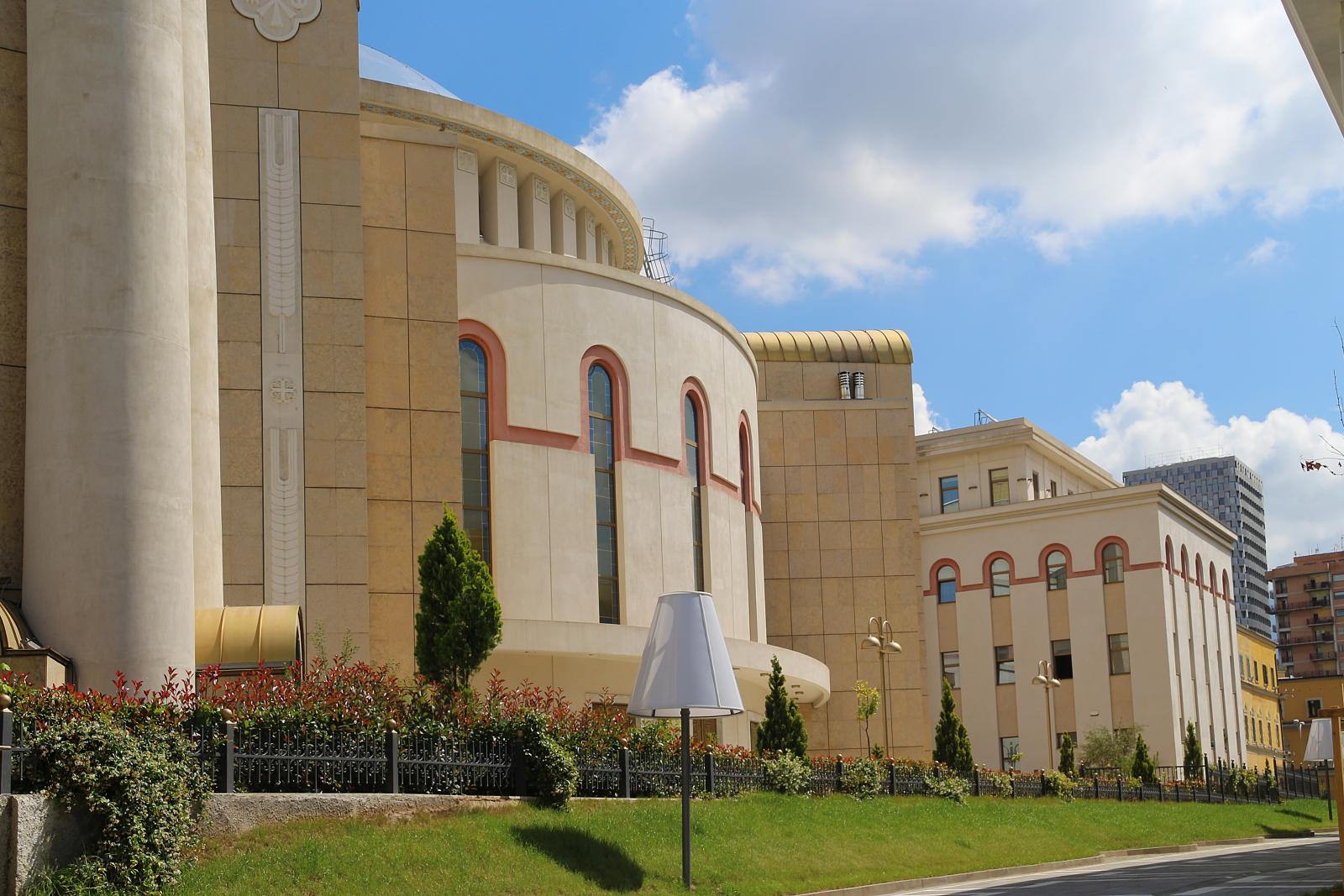

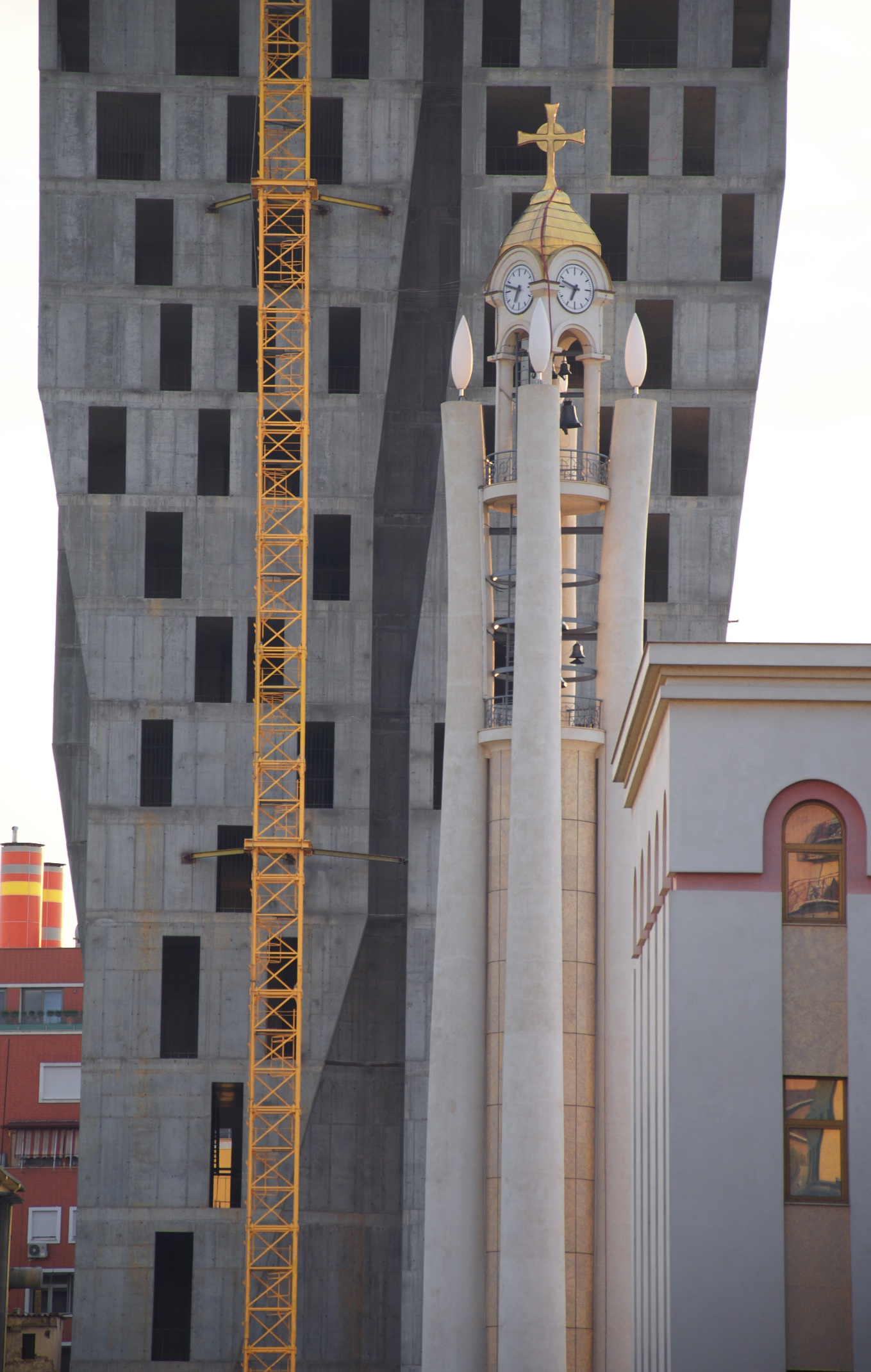

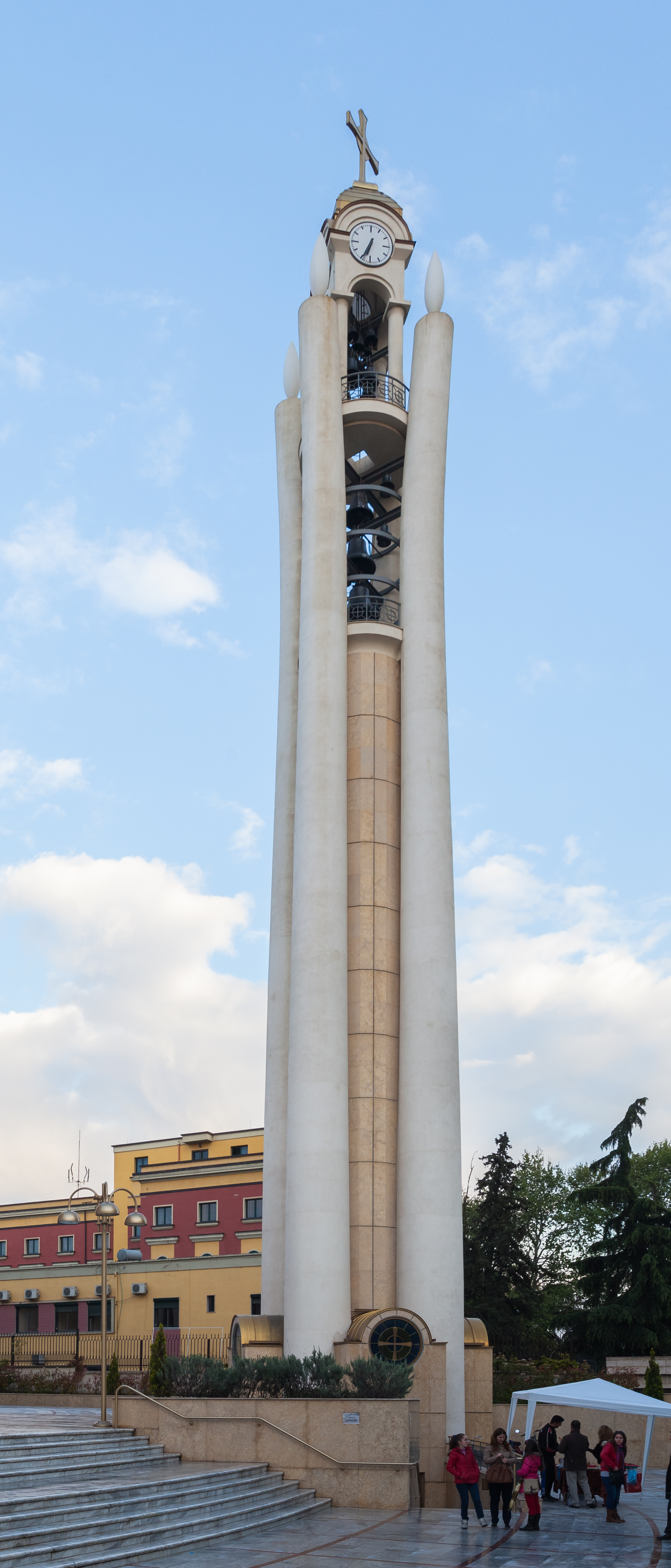

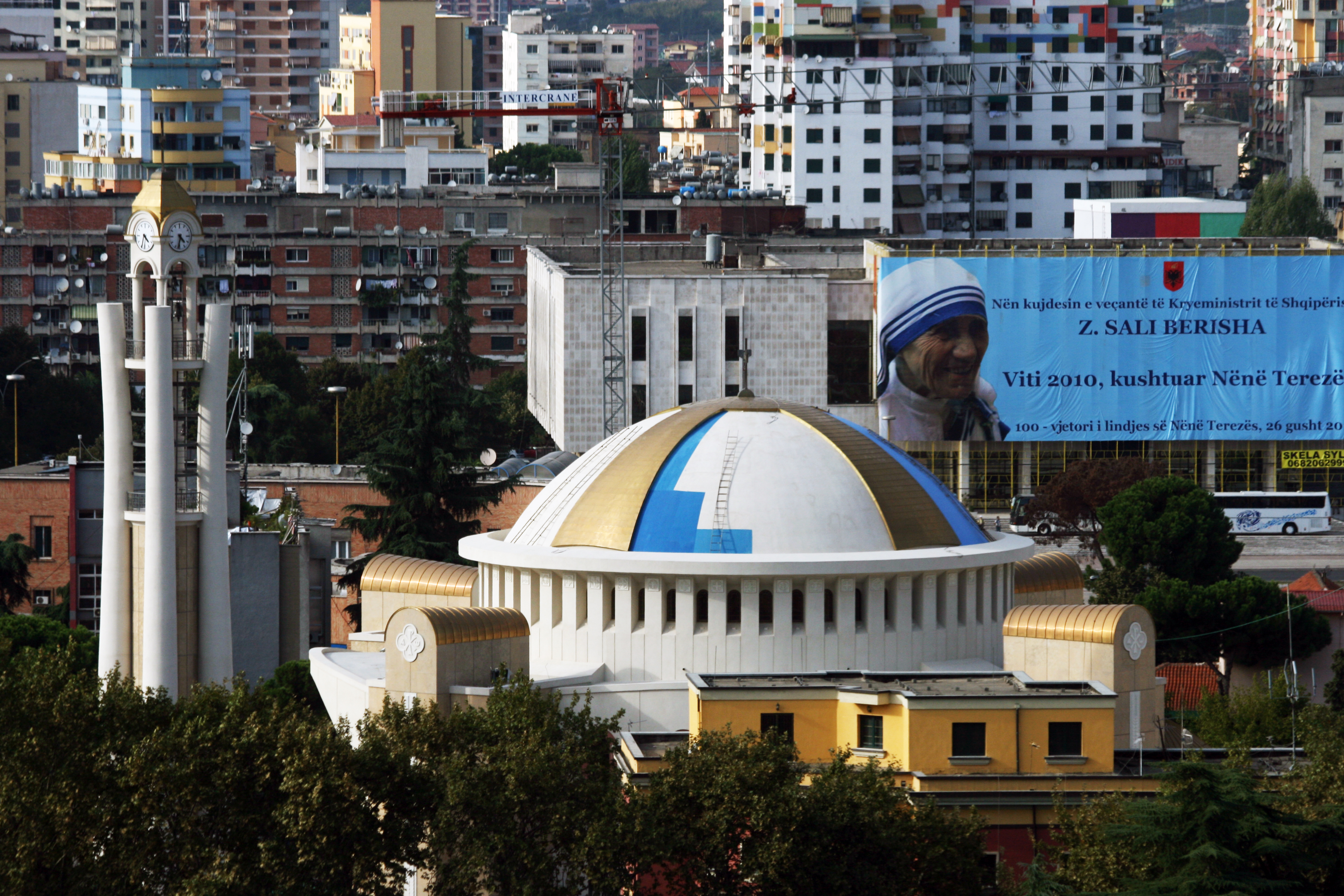

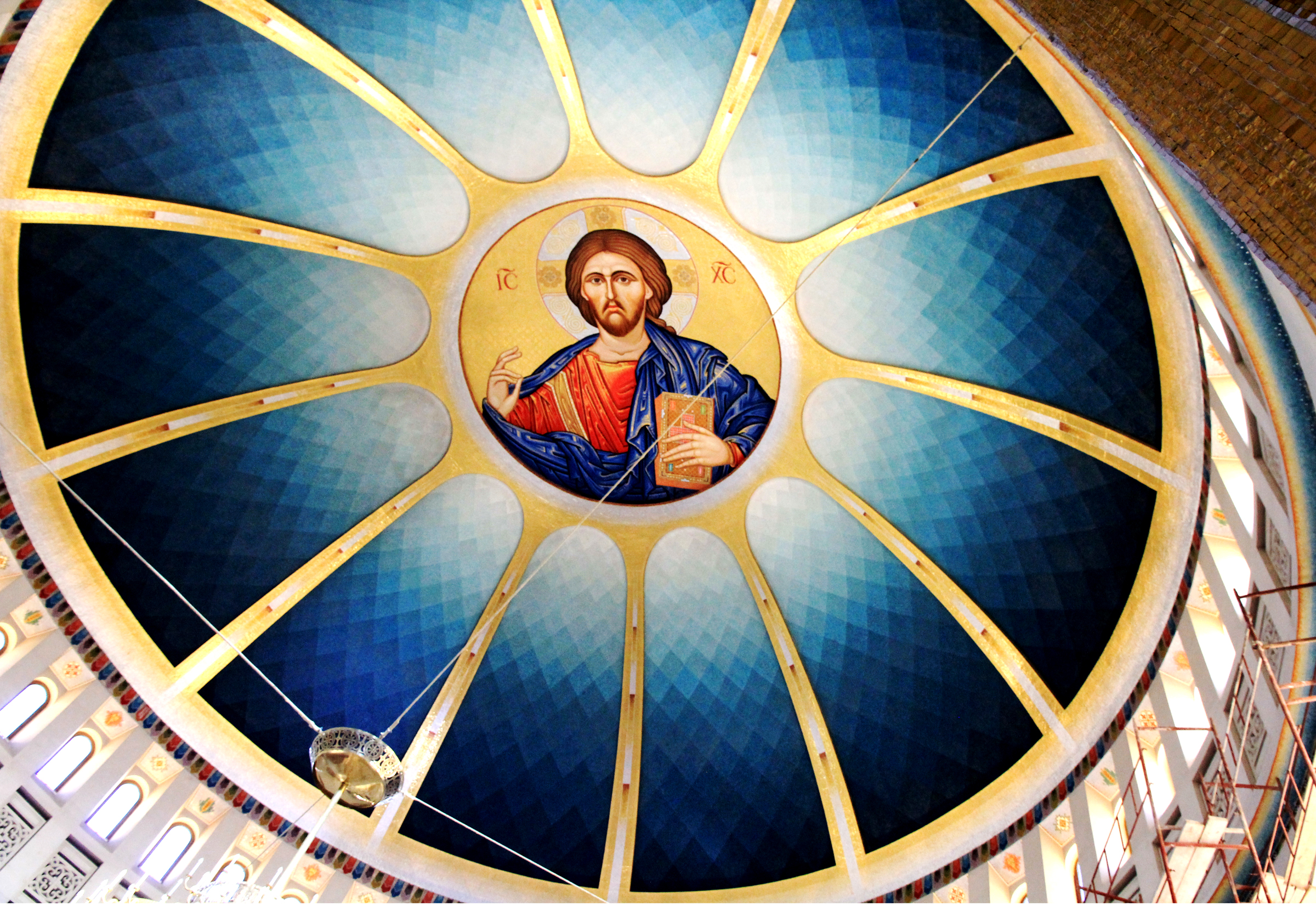

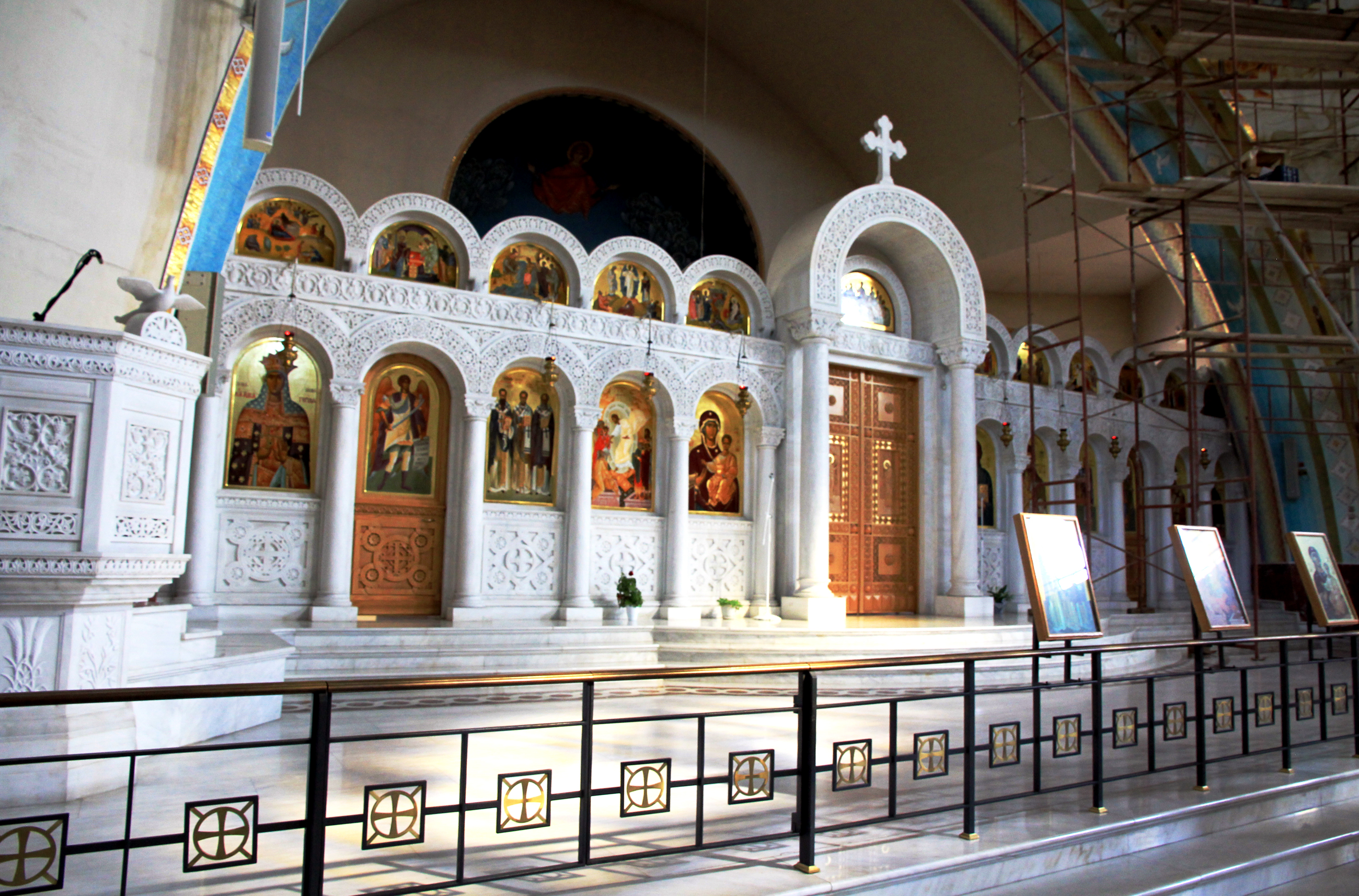

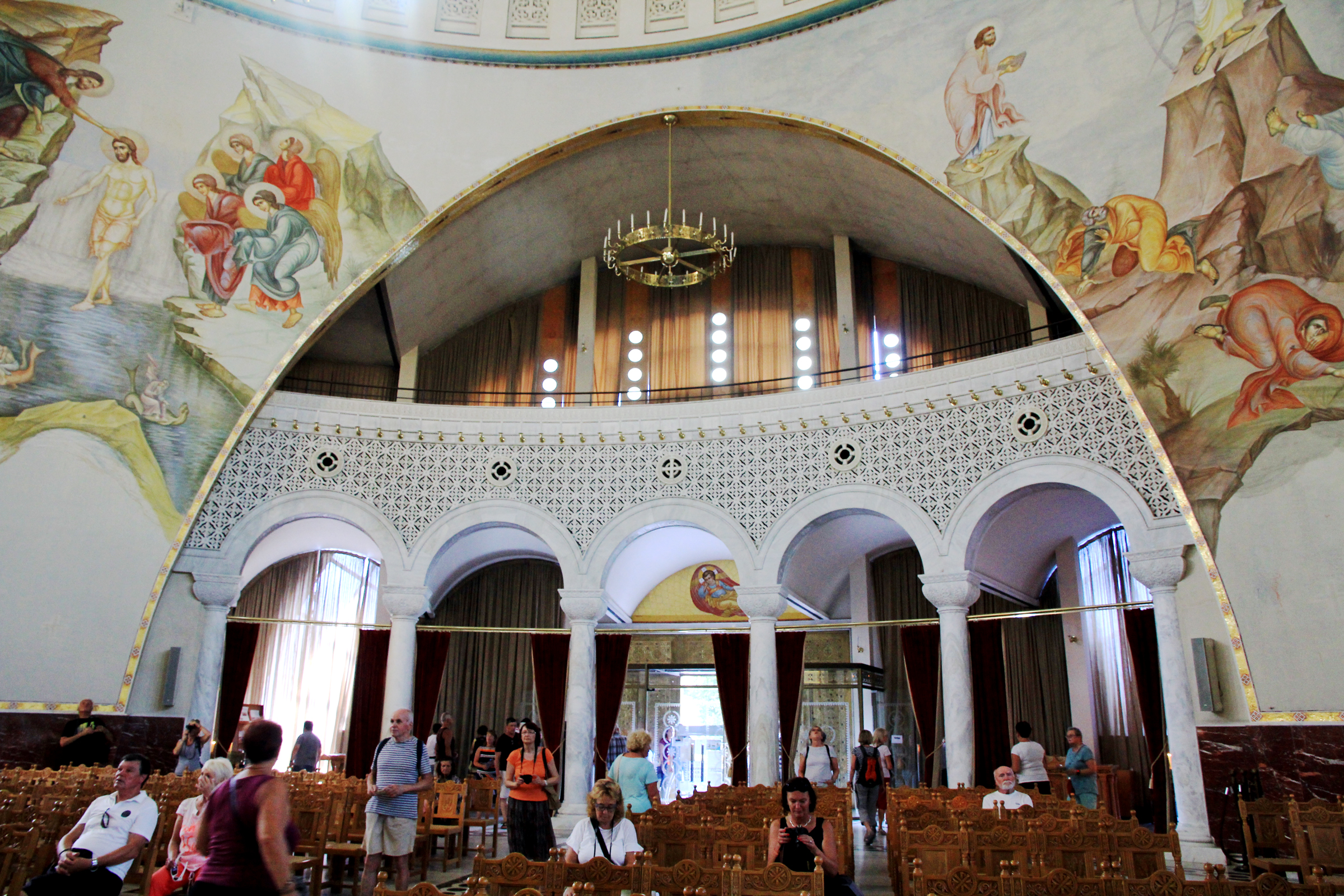

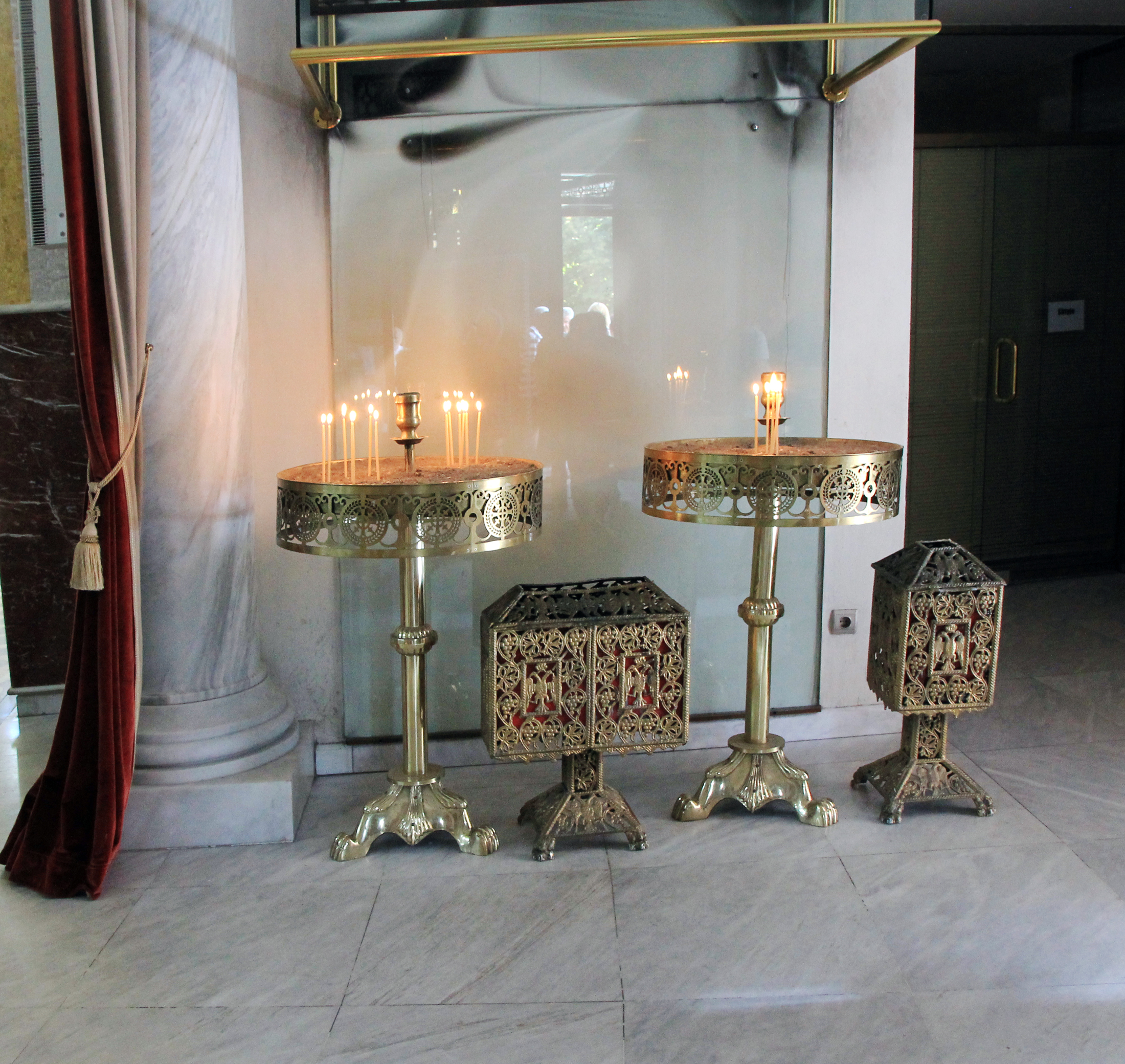

== See also ==
- List of cathedrals in Albania
- Eastern Orthodoxy in Albania
- List of largest Eastern Orthodox church buildings
