= Monastery of Saint Vlash =

Monastery of Saint Vlash (Monastery of Saint Blaise, Albanian: Manastiri i Shën Vlashit, or The New Monastery of St. Vlash, Albanian: Manastiri i Ri i Shën Vlashit, or simply Shën Vlash) is a monastery of the Albanian Orthodox Church in village Shënavlash, Durrës District, Albania.

== History ==
The Church dedicated to Saint Blaise existed in this place in the 16th century, and possibly earlier.

In 1950 a group of Russian Orthodox nuns led by schemaigumenia Maria (Dokhtorova) who were expelled from Yugoslavia "in half an hour without Church books and Church property" after a sharp cooling of relations between the USSR and Yugoslavia were settled in the monastery. They wrote an appeal to the Secretary of the Moscow Patriarchate, Lev Pariysky: "We were expelled from Yugoslavia because we are subjects of the USSR and because we did not hide that we love our homeland. We are in Albania. Here we were very well received by both the civil and ecclesiastical authorities, but You can understand how unfortunate it is not to understand the language in which the service is celebrated." The nuns asked to return to the USSR. A petition was filed for the entry of nuns to the USSR and placement in one of the monasteries, but in 1951, foreign Minister Andrey Vyshinsky informed Georgy Karpov that his Department agreed with the opinion of the Council for the Affairs of the Russian Orthodox Church that it was inappropriate for nuns and their priest to enter the territory of the USSR. In this situation, the sisters refused to travel to France or the United States, and requested assistance in placing them in Bulgaria, where they arrived in 1954. After that, monastic life in the Monastery of Saint Vlash ceased.

On April 4, 1967, a violent anti-religious campaign was launched. By a resolution of the Central Committee of the Party of Labour of November 22, 1967, Albania was declared an atheist state, being the first country in the world where any expression of religious worship was prohibited by the Constitution. They decided to demolish the monastery. However, local residents, who were supposed to be involved in the demolition, refused to destroy the monastery. Then the destroyers attracted Komsomol members from another city and came to the monastery secretly. The monastery of Saint Vlash was the first cultural object to be destroyed, and after it other places of worship of all religions were destroyed.

But even after the destruction, the Orthodox Christians continued to visit this place, light candles around the perimeter of the destroyed churches and pray here. According to Metropolitan John (Pelushi), “Only a fragment of one building survived — part of two walls but no roof — and a few trees. You could not even discern the shape of the former church, though secretly people continued to climb the hill at night in order to pray. It was recognized as a sacred place".

In 1996, the monastery was revived and in the same year the Holy Resurrection Seminary of the Albanian Orthodox Church, founded in 1992, moved here. Restoration of the temple and the surrounding complex continued until 2001. The Seminary was transformed into a theological Academy, where not only men but also women study; a medical center was created at the monastery, and an orphanage was opened.

As OrthoChristian.Com wrote in 2016: "The Orthodox Shen Vlash Monastery in honor of St. Blaise is known to everybody in Durres. Restored, it proudly dominates the city, several miles away from the center. These several miles, according to Fr. Nikolaj (Nikolai) Nushi, a monastery priest, by no means prevents residents of Durres, other Albanian towns and other Balkan countries from coming here".
