= 1994 Albanian constitutional referendum =

- 7 November 1994

Results
Choice	Votes	%
Yes	699,245	43.62%
No	903,630	56.38%
Valid votes	1,602,875	95.59%
Invalid or blank votes	73,958	4.41%
Total votes	1,676,833	100.00%
Registered voters/turnout	1,985,986	84.43%

A constitutional referendum was held in Albania on 7 November 1994. Voters were asked whether they approved of the new constitution published on 6 October, which would have given more power to the country's president. However, it was rejected by voters, with just 43.6% in favour. Voter turnout was 84.4%.

== Results ==
Choice	Votes	%
For	699,245	43.62
Against	903,630	56.38
Invalid blank votes	73,958	–
Total	1,676,833	100
Registered voters/turnout	1,985,986	84.43
Source: Nohlen & Stöver
